This list of The Karate Kid and Cobra Kai characters reflects fictional characters from The Karate Kid franchise. Josh Heald, Jon Hurwitz, and Hayden Schlossberg define the following works as part of the Miyagi-Verse: The Karate Kid (1984), The Karate Kid Part II (1986), The Karate Kid Part III (1989), The Next Karate Kid (1994), and the Cobra Kai television series (2018–present). A 2010 remake however exists in an alternate universe. In addition, Jon Hurwitz clarified that the Karate Kid series is not canon, but an Easter Egg from it appears in Season 3, in response to the question about The Karate Kid animated series official status within The Karate Kid universe.

Overview

Miyagi-Verse
 An  indicates an appearance through pre-recorded material.
 An  indicates a performer stood in as a character's body-double for fight sequences.
 A  indicates an actor or actress portrayed a younger version of their character.

Miyagi-Verse

The Karate Kid (1984)

Daniel LaRusso

Mr. Miyagi

Ali Mills

Johnny Lawrence

John Kreese

Lucille LaRusso
Lucille LaRusso (Randee Heller) is Daniel's mother, Amanda's mother-in-law, and the paternal grandmother of the LaRusso siblings, Samantha and Anthony LaRusso. She is a widow who relocates Daniel from New Jersey to Southern California due to her computer job transfer. It doesn't seem to have worked out well for her, as she later tells Daniel while working as a waitress she will be on a manager's training program two nights a week and can earn way more than in computers. Although Lucille is a down-to-earth and independent woman, she is greatly concerned about Daniel's harassment from Johnny and his gang, an issue which is shared by Mr. Miyagi. She gets along well with Ali, and in contrast to the formality of Ali's parents, refers to herself as "Lucille" rather than "Mrs. LaRusso". She is a strong influence in Daniel's life and supports Mr. Miyagi's influence in his life.

In the sequel series Cobra Kai, she is shown to initially have a troubled relationship with her daughter-in-law, Amanda, which they resolve through the intervention of Lucille's granddaughter, Samantha. Lucille has fond memories of Mr. Miyagi and his support of her family. She also shares memories of her late husband, Daniel's father, with Daniel when he is having marital difficulties with Amanda.

Bobby Brown
Bobby Brown (Ron Thomas) is a friend of Johnny and a fellow student at the Cobra Kai dojo. Bobby was Kreese's second-best student, though Johnny's most prominent right-hand man appeared to be Dutch. Although one of Johnny's gang (he slide tackles Daniel during soccer tryouts on the first day of school, prompting Daniel to tackle him and land a punch to his face, thus getting Daniel kicked out of the tryouts), Bobby is seen as a more compassionate character than his friends. He tries to stop Johnny from ruining the beach party, stop him from harassing Daniel, and from doing further damage to Daniel during the fight alongside the South Sea apartments during the Halloween party. During the Semi-finals of the tournament, Kreese orders Bobby to put Daniel "out of commission", which Bobby reluctantly attempts to do by landing a kick to Daniel's knee, severely injuring him. After the kick, Bobby drops down and sincerely and profusely apologizes to a pain-ridden Daniel before being pulled off him and disqualified. Because Daniel was unable to continue at that time and Bobby being disqualified, he is the only Cobra Kai member that Daniel doesn't defeat. In the film's novelization, Bobby – remorseful for injuring Daniel and disgusted at not being able to fight him fairly – walks over to Kreese and throws his black belt onto the floor. He then quits Cobra Kai and leaves the arena. In the parking lot confrontation following the tournament, Bobby defends Johnny from an angry Kreese, stating that Johnny has apologized for his performance. When Kreese attacks Johnny, Bobby attempts to intervene but is assaulted by Kreese. After he is saved by Mr. Miyagi, he leaves Cobra Kai for good.

In season 2 of Cobra Kai, Bobby is now a pastor at a church. He visits his terminally ill friend, Tommy, with Johnny and Jimmy by his side. In season 3 a drunk Johnny crashes his sermon, forcing Bobby to sweep him off his feet. Johnny asks him to help fund for Miguel's surgery by sending charity funds. He later agrees to accompany Johnny to see Robby in juvenile detention, but Johnny stands both of them up after he reluctantly stays at the hospital to help Miguel and his family, infuriating Robby and Bobby. Johnny later calls Bobby up to apologize for missing the appointment to visit Robby and gets irritated when Bobby refuses to schedule another visit.

Although his marital status hasn't been discussed as of season 3, a wedding band is clearly visible on his left ring finger in a number of scenes (e.g. when he prays to God for forgiveness before sweep kicking a drunk Johnny in front of his congregation).

Tommy
Tommy (Rob Garrison) was a friend of Johnny and a fellow student at the Cobra Kai dojo. He is known for being the most vocal and sarcastic of the Cobra Kai gang. He is the third Cobra Kai member to be defeated by Daniel in the All Valley Under-18 Karate Championships tournament and afterward, he is heard cheering Johnny on from the sidelines during the final match with Daniel, telling to "Get him a body bag." after Johnny re-aggravates Daniel's leg injury. He also had another memorable quote when Ali is seen walking with Daniel at school; he yells out in anger towards them "It must be 'take a worm for a walk week'". Though Tommy delights in the endless hazing of Daniel by the Cobra Kai, he is clearly shocked and dismayed when Bobby reluctantly injures Daniel's leg on Kreese's command. In the parking lot confrontation following the tournament where Kreese scolds Johnny for losing, Tommy pleads with Kreese to release Johnny from the chokehold that he has him in, even going so far as to furiously and adamantly agreeing with Mr. Miyagi's demands to let him go. Kreese refuses and even strikes Tommy in the face, knocking him to the ground. After Mr. Miyagi defeats a humiliated Kreese, Tommy leaves Cobra Kai for good.

In Season 1 of Cobra Kai, Johnny blames Mr. Miyagi for giving Tommy brain damage while protecting Daniel from the Cobra Kai gang back in 1984. In Season 2, Tommy is terminally ill from cancer. Wanting to go out on his own terms, he breaks out of the hospital to go motorcycle riding with Johnny, Bobby, and Jimmy. The four then go to a bar and joke about their youth when they end up getting into a bar fight. Afterwards, the gang go into the woods to have a campfire, revealing to Johnny that he was in love with Ali their first year as they had the same homeroom, but put his feelings aside after Johnny started dating Ali, revealing he inspired Tommy to join Cobra Kai. In turn, Johnny opens up about how he never got over his breakup with her, despite dating other women. Tommy is found dead the next morning. The last scene shows a deceased Tommy being zipped in a body bag (an ironic nod to his line at the end of The Karate Kid). Sadly, this was also Rob Garrison's final role, as he died in 2019.

Jimmy
Jimmy (Tony O'Dell) is a friend of Johnny and a fellow student at the Cobra Kai dojo. Jimmy is known for being the quietest member (having only a couple of lines in the film) and the only brown belt in Johnny's quintet group. He is the second Cobra Kai member to be defeated by Daniel in the All Valley Under-18 Karate Championships tournament. Jimmy expresses shock when Bobby is ordered by Kreese to injure Daniel and is present when Kreese attacks Johnny following his loss and second-place showing. Although he does not physically nor verbally intervene, he shows disgust at Kreese. After Mr. Miyagi defeats Kreese, he leaves Cobra Kai for good.

In Season 2 of Cobra Kai, Jimmy is a married man with two sons. During the outing with Johnny, Bobby, and Tommy, he expresses his distrust of Kreese to Johnny.

Dutch

Dutch (Chad McQueen) is a friend of Johnny and a fellow student at the Cobra Kai dojo. Dutch is also the most brutal of the gang, and takes pleasure in bullying Daniel. He can be seen hopping up and down whenever the Cobras confront Daniel as they are about to beat him, even confronting him in the locker room before the start of the All Valley Under-18 Karate Championships tournament and telling Daniel he is "dead meat". He is the fourth Cobra Kai member to be defeated by Daniel during the tournament before facing Bobby in the semi-final round. It is rumored that a deleted scene exists of Dutch becoming angered by Daniel scoring a point on him, resulting in him tackling Daniel to the mat in a scuffle and being pulled away by tournament officials, leading to his disqualification. This would explain why it appeared that Daniel won their match after only scoring a single point. In contrast to his friends, Dutch cracks a smile after Kreese orders Bobby to put Daniel "out of commission". Dutch also appears with the other Cobra Kais when Kreese assaults Johnny for coming in second place. Despite pleas from the others for Kreese to stop, Dutch is notably silent, his face is partly hidden under a baseball cap and he turns away once Kreese places Johnny in the chokehold. When the dust settles, he leaves Cobra Kai along with Johnny and the other students. 

To date, Dutch has not appeared in Cobra Kai (due to McQueen's scheduling conflicts), but the series has revealed aspects of his life. In Season 2, Johnny, Tommy, and Jimmy recall an incident in 1984 when they all went out one weekend and were so drunk that Dutch broke a dartboard at a bar, sending him to juvenile hall. They also referred to the fact that Dutch is currently serving a 5 to 10-year prison sentence at Lompoc Federal Penitentiary.

Darryl Vidal
Darryl Vidal (Darryl Vidal) is a highly skilled karate opponent and fourth-place winner of the All Valley Under-18 Karate Championships tournament. After defeating several Cobra Kai members, he is defeated by Johnny with three unanswered points in the semi-finals. Darryl is the only fighter that Johnny shakes hands with after a match, a rare sign of respect for an opponent. Darryl is seen at the end of the film congratulating Daniel on winning the tournament.

Vidal was mentioned by name in Cobra Kai Season 2 in conversation between Johnny and Tommy. He is mentioned again in Season 3 by John Kreese, who describes Vidal as a third generation black belt and a highly skilled fighter. Kreese mentions to Johnny's son Robby that Vidal had beaten Johnny in the 1981 All-Valley Karate Tournament and was the champion that year, noting Johnny's potential as a fighter.

Freddy Fernandez
Freddy Fernandez (Israel Juarbe) is a high school student that lives in the same apartment building that Daniel and his mother move into. He befriends Daniel and invites him to a beach party. During the party, when Daniel notices Ali, Freddy encourages Daniel to talk to her but doesn't defend him when Johnny crashes the party and beats him up. The following day, he and his friends shun Daniel at their school's soccer tryouts. He is next seen in the crowd at the All Valley Under-18 Karate Championships tournament cheering for Daniel. At the end of the film, he is seen cheering for Daniel and along with some of his friends, lifting Daniel up after his win, possibly reestablishing their friendship.

Susan
Susan (Juli Fields) is one of Ali's best friends. She dislikes Daniel, referring to him as "fungus" during the Halloween dance. She is later seen at the All Valley Under-18 Karate Championships tournament in the crowd cheering. At the end of the film, she is seen walking onto the ring, along with Freddy and several others cheering for Daniel.

Barbara
Barbara (Dana Andersen) is one of Ali's friends. Like Susan, she does not care much for Daniel at the beginning but is seen cheering for him in the end.

Ali's Parents
Ali's father Mr. Mills (William Bassett), and her mother, Mrs. Mills (Sharon Spelman) appear to silently judge Daniel when Ali introduces them in front of her house. Mrs. Mills prefers Johnny, whom she dances with at the country club, before trading partners with Ali, who is dancing with her father. At that moment, Ali and Mr. Mills are having a difficult conversation, where he conveys his disappointment that Ali would rather go out with "that boy from Reseda" again instead of Johnny. Over thirty years later (Season 3, Episode 9 of Cobra Kai), Ali returns home to spend Christmas with her parents. After Mrs. Mills (Deborah May) returns home from Christmas shopping for Ali's children, she asks Ali to come to the holiday party the next evening. Ali later tells Johnny that her parents disapprove of her upcoming divorce.

Mrs. Milo
Mrs. Milo (Frances Bay) is the negative old lady that lives in the same apartment building as Daniel. She was seen in the first movie remarking how this place was a dump and how she was a New Jersey native like Daniel, specifically Parsippany. Daniel exclaims that is also home to his Uncle Louie, but the only man named Louis she knew from there does not have the surname of Larusso. She is also seen in the third film, greeting Daniel upon his return from Japan with bad news. She lost her residence alongside the Larussos as their apartment complex changed ownership.

The Referee
The Referee of the ring is played by Pat E. Johnson in the first three Karate Kid films. He was seen outside his tournament duties in each of the three films.

Jerry Robertson
Jerry Robertson (Larry B. Scott) is another student at the Cobra Kai dojo, but he is not a part of Johnny's gang. He is the brown belt student who is defeated by Bobby in a sparring match at the dojo. He was also the first Cobra Kai member defeated by Daniel in the 1984 All Valley Under-18 Karate Championships tournament.

The Announcer
The Announcer (Bruce Malmuth) for the All Valley Under-18 Karate Championships tournament has appeared in the first two Karate Kid films. He seems to have a deep respect for Daniel.

Judy (Karate Kid)
Judy was Daniel's girlfriend when he lived in New Jersey. She appears very briefly during the first few minutes of Karate Kid with a group of people surrounding Lucille's car. When Daniel gets into the car he says: "Bye, Judy". Later after Daniel meets Ali, Lucille asks him (when they meet in a restaurant), "Is she prettier than Judy?" Daniel responds, "Oh, ma, she buries Judy!" In Season 2, Episode 1 of Cobra Kai, Daniel tells Samantha about Judy: "Did I ever tell you about my first girlfriend? I was about your age and she was in another league. Beautiful eyes, amazing smile. I thought it would last forever". When Samantha asks what happened, Daniel states: "Grandma moved us out of New Jersey. Came to California. I met a new girl, Ali. This time I was sure she was the one. I mean Judy was great, but this was true love".

The Karate Kid Part II (1986)

Karate Kid actor Martin Kove, briefly appeared as John Kreese in the beginning of the film. In addition, Karate Kid actors Rob Garrison (Tommy), Ron Thomas (Bobby Brown), Tony O'Dell (Jimmy), and William Zabka (Johnny Lawrence) also briefly appeared.

Daniel LaRusso

Mr. Miyagi

Kumiko

Chozen Toguchi

Sato
Sato (Danny Kamekona) is Chozen's uncle and Miyagi's former best friend with whom he had a strong brotherly friendship, to the point Miyagi asked his father to teach Sato karate, which, traditionally, was only taught from father to son. Sato was arranged to marry a girl named Yukie, but she had already fallen in love with Miyagi, as he had with her. Their love was so strong that Miyagi had announced that he would break the tradition of arranged marriage and marry Yukie anyway. Sato felt disgraced and betrayed by Miyagi and challenged him to a fight to save his honor; Miyagi instead left Okinawa the next day, angering Sato further. By the time Miyagi returned to Tomi village with Daniel, Sato – now a rich industrialist – owned the whole town. Still bearing a bitter vendetta against Miyagi, he was eager to face his old friend in a death match. This never occurred as Miyagi saved his life during a typhoon with a mighty chop shattering a pinning wooden beam, deeply impressing Sato with his supposed rival's true might and restoring their friendship. Soon after, Sato disowns Chozen for refusing to help Daniel rescue a young girl from the typhoon, prompting Sato to go out to assist Daniel himself. Realizing how his hatred had consumed him, he made amends by returning ownership of Tomi village back to the villagers and helping them rebuild.

Sato is a highly skilled and respected karate master who appears to be more rigid and firm in his technique than Miyagi. His dojo in Naha City is used to instruct American military police in karate, as it is shown in Chozen's flashbacks in Season 5.

In Cobra Kai (Season 3) Sato was mentioned to have modified Tomi Village to become a tourist attraction sometime after Daniel and Mr. Miyagi's departure from Okinawa. His business decision boosted the local economy. He was also credited by Chozen to have turned the latter's life around after his fight with Daniel. Chozen mentions that Sato had died, and left Chozen all of the Miyagi property. Now a better man, Chozen displays a great deal of respect for both his uncle and Mr. Miyagi.

Yukie
Yukie (Nobu McCarthy) is Mr. Miyagi's loving childhood girlfriend and Kumiko's aunt. Although she was to marry Sato in an arranged marriage, she had fallen in love with Mr. Miyagi, which is what made Sato challenge Mr. Miyagi to a death match to save his honor. Mr. Miyagi never fought him, however. The day after Sato's challenge, he left for America. When Mr. Miyagi returned to Tomi village, it was revealed that Yukie had never married Sato. During the events of The Karate Kid Part II, it was shown that the two still had feelings for one another and they began to rekindle their romance.

In Cobra Kai Season 3, Kumiko told Daniel that Yukie had died, and that she had inherited Yukie's home. Kumiko also gave Daniel a box of love letters from Mr. Miyagi to Yukie that were written after Daniel and Mr. Miyagi left Okinawa.

Yuna
Yuna (Traci Toguchi) is a young girl who lives at Tomi Village. She rings the bell as a typhoon roars into the village to warn everyone to take shelter. She is caught in the storm and is dangerously close to the power lines but Daniel comes and saves her. She is also present at the Castle during the O-Bon festival as she thanked Daniel for saving her life and witnesses the fight between Daniel and Chozen.

In Season 3 of Cobra Kai, Daniel returns to Okinawa after traveling to Japan in an attempt to save his business by forever reviving his soon-to-be-canceled contract with Doyona, a marketing conglomerate that handles international sales for Asian automobiles. Kumiko introduces Daniel to a young woman whom she calls a mutual friend of theirs. After the woman tells Daniel that they had previously met when she was a young girl during a typhoon, Daniel realizes that it's Yuna (whose name is finally revealed in the series) and is happy to see her again. Yuna reveals to Daniel that she is now the Senior Vice President of Sales for Doyona International, the company that he is reaching out to, and that she intends to help Daniel save his business.

Toshio
Toshio (Joey Miyashima) is one of Chozen's cronies who helps torment Daniel.

Taro
Taro (Marc Hayashi) is one of Chozen's cronies who helps torment Daniel.

Miyagi Chōjun
Miyagi Chōjun (Charlie Tanimoto) is Miyagi's father, whose illness compels Miyagi to return to Okinawa after running away when he was a young man. An elderly karate master who trained Miyagi and his childhood best friend Sato, Miyagi Chōjun calls for both of them to come to his bedside. His last act before dying is to join their hands together, encouraging them to make peace with one another.

Ichiro
Ichiro (Arsenio "Sonny" Trinidad, who also appeared as a different character in The Next Karate Kid) is an old villager in Tomi Village, Okinawa. When Miyagi takes Daniel on a tour of the village, he is one of the first people that Daniel meets. He has a fondness for entertaining the village children with his shamisen. After Daniel tries and fails to practice the Drum Technique, he sees Ichiro accidentally lose control of his wheelbarrow full of carrots. Daniel helps him carry them while they formally introduce themselves to each other. When they make it to Chozen's market to exchange the carrots for money, Ichiro is witness to Daniel's first confrontation with Chozen. During an accident when Daniel helps put the carrots on the scales, the weights fall off. Daniel and Ichiro find out that one of the weights is fake, causing the people of the village to revolt and shame Chozen. Ichiro is later seen among the villagers heading for the pillbox to shelter from the Typhoon and is seen at the viewing window with Daniel, Miyagi, and Yukie looking for others caught in the storm. With the rest of the villagers, he is seen helping rebuild the damaged village, as well as dancing, with Miyagi, Yukie, Daniel, Kumiko, and Sato during the O Bon dance. Ichiro is last seen among the audience while they watch Kumiko perform and Daniel's eventual fight with Chozen.

The Karate Kid Part III (1989)

Karate Kid actors Randee Heller and Martin Kove briefly reprised their roles as Lucille LaRusso and John Kreese in the film.

Daniel LaRusso

Mr. Miyagi

Terry Silver

Mike Barnes

Jessica Andrews

Snake
Snake (Jonathan Avildsen) is one of Terry's henchmen and Mike's cronies, who helps torment Daniel. He is known to be the "bad boy" of L.A. (implied by Silver). It is unknown if Snake has any martial arts skills, though he seems to have some skills when he tried to land a punch on Mr. Miyagi, which Miyagi later countered during a second confrontation on Miyagi's bonsai shop. Snake was last seen at the tournament, taunting Daniel as he lies on the mat, only to be quickly knocked down by Daniel. He was disappointed and humiliated when Mike lost to Daniel.

Dennis
Dennis (William Christopher Ford) is one of Silver's henchmen and Mike's cronies who help torment Daniel. He is a karate practitioner who is assigned to help Mike with his training. But Dennis is not as skilled as Mike nor Daniel, due to the fact that Daniel easily defeated him during a second confrontation on Miyagi's bonsai shop and a sparring match against Mike on the Cobra Kai dojo, in which he lost. Dennis rarely speaks. He only has two lines throughout the entire film.

Louie LaRusso Sr.
Uncle Louie (Joseph V. Perry) is Daniel's uncle and Lucille's brother-in-law. During the events of The Karate Kid Part III, he becomes ill and Lucille returns to New Jersey to care for him. Louie has his namesake son, Louie LaRusso Jr., and daughter Vanessa, appearing in Cobra Kai. He is Italian-American.

Milos
Milos (Jan Triska) is Terry Silver's butler.

Margaret
Margaret (Diana Webster) is Terry Silver's secretary. She sees Mike Barnes when he first is introduced to Terry Silver. After Barnes departs, Margaret tells her boss that Mike Barnes is an obnoxious unbearable young man.

The Announcer
The Announcer (Rick Hurst) is the announcer of the All Valley Under-18 Karate Championships tournament in The Karate Kid Part III.

The Next Karate Kid (1994)

Karate Kid actor Ralph Macchio does not appear as Daniel LaRusso in this film.

Mr. Miyagi

Julie Pierce

Julie Pierce (Hilary Swank) is a troubled teenage girl who lost her parents (an unnamed father and Susan) in a car accident, and is now living with her paternal grandmother Louisa Pierce. Mr. Miyagi is an old friend of her grandmother (whose late husband Jack was his commanding officer during WW II) and agrees to spend time mentoring Julie (who has become violent and unmanageable).  His interest in Julie grows after he discovers that her late father taught her Karate (they used to practice after school and Julie thought it was a game). Miyagi tells her that he first taught Karate to her grandfather Jack, who then taught it to his son.

At first, Julie wants nothing to do with him. Over time, however, she learns to accept him as a teacher. Like Daniel, Julie is the target of bullies in her school. In this case, however, she becomes the target of Ned and The Alpha Elite after she rejects Ned's sexual advances. With the skills and self-confidence that Mr. Miyagi instills in Julie, she is able to stand up to Ned when a fight at the docks takes place (while the rest of Ned's gang and Col. Dugan watch on) and comes out victorious. When Ned loses, Col. Dugan tries to get the other members of the Alpha Elite to fight her, but they all refuse, thus showing that they finally gained respect for her.

Jack Pierce
Lieutenant Jack Pierce is Julie's late grandfather, the husband of Louisa Pierce, and the father of Julie's unnamed father. Jack Pierce was an officer with the 442nd Infantry Regiment (United States) during WWII, and a friend of Mr. Miyagi (who was a staff sergeant during the war). Mr. Miyagi also taught him karate (as a way of saying "thank you" after Jack saved his life), and in turn Jack taught Karate to his son, who then taught it to Julie.

Louisa Pierce
Louisa Pierce (Constance Towers) is Julie's grandmother, the wife of the late Jack Pierce, and the mother of Julie's unnamed father. She and Mr. Miyagi knew each other for many years since her late husband was a good friend of Miyagi during and after World War II. Miyagi eventually sent her to stay in his home in Los Angeles, so that he could spend time with Julie and help her heal from the trauma of losing her parents.

Colonel Dugan
Col. Paul Dugan (Michael Ironside) leads a JROTC-style program, the Alpha Elite, at Julie's school, and his style of instruction and morals he instills upon his students are very similar to those of John Kreese from the earlier films. In the last scene at the docks after Miyagi and Julie rescue Eric from being beaten up anymore, Col. Dugan and Mr. Miyagi engage in a fight. Mr. Miyagi easily defeats him, and as it seems that Mr. Miyagi will land one last fatal blow to Col. Dugan, he humorously blows on his nose and lets him drop to the ground (in the same style that Mr. Miyagi defeated Kreese at the start of the second movie) where his students look down at him with disappointing looks.

Eric McGowen
Eric McGowen (Chris Conrad) is a new student who joins Col. Dugan's group to someday become accepted into the Air Force Academy. He shows infatuation when in Julie's presence, even up to occasionally teasing her at times just for her to warm up to him. Although Julie initially disliked him (on account of him being part of Col. Dugan's ruthless group), she begins to bond more with him after he watches over her hawk, Angel as a favor when she was away for training. While he and Julie are at a school dance, he is confronted by Ned after a stunt went wrong. Ned then challenges him in front of the school, and while Eric wants to fight, Julie stops it. Later that night while Eric is dropping Julie off at home, Ned breaks the windows of Eric's car. While Julie runs inside to get Mr. Miyagi, Eric drives to the docks to confront Ned; however, he is ambushed by Col. Dugan and the rest of Ned's gang. They all then have a hand in beating Eric; he is then saved by Miyagi and Julie as they arrive.

Ned Randall
Ned Randall (Michael Cavalieri) is a skilled academy student and gang leader of the Alpha Elite with bullying tendencies. He constantly tries to flirt with Julie, only to be rejected by her multiple times. As a response to the rejections, he does whatever he can to make Julie's life miserable like getting her almost suspended from school by lying to Col. Dugan that Julie was smoking, causing her to shove him and storm off. Later, after he sees Eric with Julie at the dance and when he sees them kiss in Eric's car, he smashes the car windows and challenges him to a fight. After he and the other members of his gang beat up Eric, Julie and Mr. Miyagi find them and leave with Eric, only to be stopped by Ned who tries to grab Julie. They both fight and Julie manages to defeat him. When Col. Dugan tries to force the others to fight Julie, they all refuse, as they have gained respect for her. After Col. Dugan was defeated by Miyagi, Ned expresses his disappointment in him, saying "You said, you had all the answers, Colonel. You were wrong".

Towards the end of the film, Ned demonstrates a degree of morality that indicates he wasn't entirely a bad person. When Dugan orders the boys to finish Eric off, Ned's expression indicates that he was shocked and reluctant to harm someone when they're incapacitated. Also, when Colonel Dugan tells him to "put her away" before fighting Julie, Ned looks at Dugan with a shocked expression before reluctantly agreeing. This demonstrates that while he'd be happy to beat someone up, he may have qualms about harming anyone to the point of disabling or potentially killing someone.

Charlie
Charlie (Walton Goggins) is one of Ned's friends and a fellow student of the Alpha Elite. After witnessing Col. Dugan putting so much pressure onto Ned of severely beating Eric McGowan at the docks, he sympathizes with Ned that he doesn't have to keep going at it. Col. Dugan then tries to force him to fight Julie (along with the other members) but he also refuses to fight after Ned is defeated by her. He is much like Cobra Kai student Bobby Brown from the original film.

Monks
Abbot (Arsenio "Sonny" Trinidad, who also appeared as a different character in The Karate Kid II) is the lead monk of the monastery, as well as a kind, patient man, but one with limits. For example, when Julie tries to kill a cockroach, he leads the rest of the monks in a vow of shunning, refusing to speak with Julie; in turn, Julie learns their vow to respect all living things. When Julie apologizes and brings him a Praying Mantis as a gift, the Abbot is grateful, calls off the shunning, and helps Miyagi train Julie. Later on, he and the monks inadvertently startle Julie while preparing to show a surprise birthday cake to her. Once they finished singing happy birthday, the Abbot says she is allowed one wish and one gift. Julie uses her wish to ask if some of the monks could come to visit her back home (which they grant, after consideration). As for the gift, they, along with Miyagi, give a demonstration of Zen Archery. The Abbot is later seen with two other Monks approaching Julie's house, the Abbot bearing a gift to Miyagi. When Eric comes to pick up Julie, they, along with Miyagi, play the role of overprotective parents to see if Eric wouldn't take advantage of her. While Julie and Eric are at Prom, Miyagi at the behest of the monks takes them bowling. They inadvertently start a confrontation with the local player, but decide to settle it with a wager; the monks use their Zen abilities to win the game, which in turn wins the bet, and the player, humbled by his defeat, bows in respect. Later on, they teach him Zen bowling as a token of friendship. The Abbot is last seen among the monks, warning Miyagi of Ned attacking Eric and Julie after they returned home from the prom.

Tall Monk (Jim Ishida)

Monk (Rodney Kageyama)

Buddhist Monk (Seth Sakai)

Senator Daniel Inouye 
Senator Daniel Inouye makes a cameo giving the opening speech at Arlington National Cemetery for a commendation for Japanese-Americans who fought in the 442nd Regimental Combat Team during World War II.<ref>[https://scholar.lib.vt.edu/VA-news/VA-Pilot/issues/1994/vp940915/09150055.htm FEMININE ``KARATE KID IS HEAVY-HANDED]</ref>

Cobra Kai (2018–present): returning

 Daniel LaRusso 

 John Kreese 

 Johnny Lawrence 

Ali Mills

Chozen Toguchi

Kumiko

Terry Silver

Mike Barnes

Jessica Andrews

Cobra Kai: Season 1 (2018) introductionsKarate Kid actor Randee Heller reprised her role as Lucille LaRusso (Daniel's mother) in this season while Martin Kove reprised his role as John Kreese in the season finale.

Amanda LaRusso
Amanda LaRusso (née Steiner) (Courtney Henggeler) is Daniel's wife and co-owner of LaRusso Auto Group, as well as Samantha and Anthony's mother. She often serves as a voice of reason to Daniel in his clashes with Johnny and later Cobra Kai, offering calm and sensible insight in contrast to his impulsiveness. When Johnny arrives unannounced at their home, and begins to fight with Daniel, she calmly ends the confrontation by convincing them to discuss their differences over breakfast. After Daniel cuts ties with their employee, Robby Keene over being Johnny's son, Amanda not only convinces him to make amends with Robby, but to become his coach during the All-Valley Tournament.

In Season 2, Amanda is supportive of Daniel's rekindled interest in karate, but is also concerned about his ability to balance it with work. LaRusso Auto Group goes into a slump, which Amanda and Daniel reverse by completing a task of selling ten cars in one day. However, Amanda becomes frustrated as Daniel begins to spend more time developing Miyagi-Do as a full-time dojo than helping her manage the dealership chain. When Anoush leaves their dealership to join Tom Cole's (after Daniel stood him up), a furious Amanda tells Daniel he is failing to find balance, and stops speaking with him. As an attempt to reconcile with her, Daniel takes her on a date to a Mexican restaurant and is surprised to see Johnny at the same place with his girlfriend, Carmen Diaz. Amanda defuses the situation by suggesting a double date. When the rivalry of the dojos escalates, culminating in an all-out karate war on the first day of school, Sam is also hospitalized with broken ribs and lacerations on her right arm from her fight with Tory. Amanda furiously puts her foot down and forces Daniel to give up his intention of Cobra Kai's demise, as well as stop Miyagi-Do and karate activities to prevent any future incidents.

In Season 3, Amanda and Daniel struggle to keep LaRusso Auto Group operating as the high school karate war has damaged their reputation due to Robby's affiliation with Miyagi-Do and actions against Miguel during the school karate war. When she learns of Kreese's students attacking Sam and breaking Demetri's right arm, Amanda attempts to get Cobra Kai shut down legally, but only receives a restraining order after slapping Kreese with Amanda filing a restraining order against Kreese. Amanda approves of Miyagi-Do reopening to stop Cobra Kai. Amanda and Ali help Daniel and Johnny put aside their rivalry and come to terms with each other during the Christmas dinner at the country club.

In Season 4, Amanda unintentionally gets Tory fired from her job when attempting to defend Sam for her actions towards her during the house fight. After Kreese tells Amanda about Tory's current home situation, she offers her help for her mother and a new job, revealing that she was once a troubled and angry teenager herself. When she was in high school, Amanda was arrested for vandalizing her math tutor's car with a baseball bat (while her math tutor was still inside the car) as retribution for breaking up her parents’ marriage, due to her math tutor's affair with Amanda’s father (of whom she had a strained relationship with). Amanda was then charged with misdemeanor reckless endangerment and was not allowed to walk during her graduation, but her parents inevitably divorced. As she was able to turn her life around by realizing that becoming angry and violent wouldn’t undo her parents’ divorce or her father’s affair and that she had to make the best of her situation, Amanda believes that Tory should also be given that chance, as Cobra Kai’s influence was enabling Tory to let her resentment, due to her home situation, cloud her judgement. She tells Daniel that people like Tory, who feel like they have been dealt a bad hand in life, constantly get written off as hopeless causes and having someone who can take the time to listen to them and understand their situation can make all the difference their lives.

Amanda eventually manages to get Tory back into school when she asks for her permission, despite Sam's protests, provided that Tory talks to someone non-karate related about her situation at home. Before the girls' finals, Tory thanks Amanda for recommending her to a therapist, who in turn helped Tory find a volunteer to care for her sick mother. Amanda requests Tory to play fair with Sam and to end her rivalry with her. Tory takes this to heart and even takes concern for Sam's injuries.

In Season 5, Amanda is frustrated that Daniel is still involved with karate as she is unaware of his past history with Terry Silver. They later attend a charity auction hosted by Silver, causing him to become paranoid. 

When Daniel leaves Amanda alone, Silver approaches her with a glass of wine and begins to gaslight her, not knowing this is part of Silver's plan to try and drive a wedge between her and Daniel. He begins to spread lies about Daniel by putting up a facade of a changed man to convince her. Furious, Amanda later confronts Daniel, who tells her it is a lie. Silver continues to manipulate Daniel by appearing to bad-mouth Amanda to one of the charity members, while he actually complimented Amanda, ultimately leading to Daniel bursting into a moment of violence. Daniel continues to try to convince Amanda that Silver is playing psychological games with them, and that everything she witnessed is based on lies. When she demands that he end his involvement with Karate and Silver, and Daniel refuses, she then tells him that she is needs space from him, and taking the children with her. Amanda, Sam, and Anthony ultimately go to Ohio to stay with her mother for a while.

During that time, she visits her cousin, Jessica Andrews, in a local restaurant. Jessica is shocked when Amanda tells her that Silver has returned. While they are talking about this, they are harassed by their high school classmate Elizabeth Anne Rooney, about Amanda’s vandalism incident during their high school years. Although Jessica and Amanda ask Lizzie-Anne to leave, Lizzie-Anne and her friends taunt them, by reminding Amanda of the high school nickname they gave her after her vandalism incident. They ultimately get into a fight with her, which Sam ends by kicking Lizzie-Anne into the bar. 

After they return to her mother's house, Amanda is astonished to hear all of the stories about Silver from Jessica that happened in 1985. Although she is surprised that Jessica never told her these stories before she met Daniel, she now realizes that Daniel has been telling the truth about Silver, pushing her to return home. She does so and now fully supports Daniel in his fight against Silver. During their time together, Jessica also reveals that she was the person who introduced Amanda to Daniel.

 Miguel Diaz 

Miguel Diaz (Xolo Maridueña) (nickname Miggy by his mother Carmen) is a 16-year-old Ecuadorian American teenager who was born on November 22nd, 2001 in America to a single mother Carmen Diaz with asthma and low self-esteem who moves in next door to Johnny. While shopping for Pepto-Bismol for his grandmother at a strip mall in Reseda, he is attacked by a group of rich bullies led by Kyler after accidentally foiling their plans to buy beer. The bullies nickname him "Rhea" after noticing the bottle of Pepto-Bismol and dump it all over him. When the bullies shove him onto Johnny's car, Johnny attacks them, beating them senselessly before he is arrested. Miguel becomes Johnny's first student in the new Cobra Kai dojo. Aside from learning karate, he is the dojo's housekeeper and website administrator. Though initially reluctant and mocking toward him, Johnny quickly comes to care for Miguel, becoming a father figure to him, despite objections from his mother.

When Daniel's daughter Sam confronts Kyler over vicious rumors he spread about her after she fought off his attempt to date rape her, Miguel beats up Kyler and his clique, gaining popularity in the school and earning Johnny's gi as the fight leads to an influx of new members to Cobra Kai. Despite Johnny's warning that he should avoid the LaRussos, Miguel begins dating Sam. Unfortunately, they break up after four months of dating when Miguel wrongly suspects Sam of cheating on him with Daniel's student and Johnny's estranged son, Robby Keene, leading to an altercation in which Miguel accidentally punches Sam. Cobra Kai's thuggish philosophy begins to affect Miguel's values, and he becomes much more violent and ruthless, to Johnny's eventual disapproval, especially when Miguel fights dirty against Robby to win the championship for Cobra Kai in the 2018 All-Valley Tournament.

In Season 2, Miguel is devastated when Sam blocks him on social media. Friction develops between Johnny and Miguel when Miguel finds out the truth about Robby's parentage after seeing a picture of Robby on Johnny's refrigerator. Johnny makes amends with his star pupil by telling him the story of Robby's birth and how he was absent for most of his life, naming it as his biggest regret. He promises to do better with Miguel than he did with Robby. Miguel is also wary of Kreese, noticing inconsistencies in Kreese's stories about his supposed military exploits during the '80s and '90s. He vehemently disapproves of Kreese's style of teaching, and when he finds out that Hawk's gang trashed Miyagi-Do and stole Mr. Miyagi's Medal of Honor, he defeats Hawk in a brutal fight during a competition at Coyote Creek and returns the medal to the LaRussos' house, but not before appalling Johnny with his ruthlessness by delivering an aggressive finishing kick to Hawk, which Johnny realizes is a result of Kreese's harsher teachings.

Miguel develops a relationship with new Cobra Kai student Tory Nichols, but he still has feelings for Sam, culminating in him kissing her at Moon's party after she learns from Aisha the truth about the medal (which Robby had withheld from her). The act is seen by Tory, who furiously challenges Sam to a fight in school the next morning. In the ensuing rumble, Miguel once again gets into a fight with Robby and even taunts him by mocking his relationship problems with Johnny and Sam. After a lengthy fight, Miguel eventually traps Robby in an arm lock and nearly decides to break his arm to end the school brawl once and for all but chooses to show him mercy and even apologizes to him after remembering a conversation where Johnny expressed regret over not teaching him the difference between mercy and honor. However, Robby, furious with Miguel for having a better relationship with Johnny than he ever did and taking advantage of Sam at Moon's party as well as his dishonorable actions against him at the 2018 All-Valley Tournament, furiously retaliates by kicking him over a balcony railing and sending him falling off the second floor. Miguel hits his back on the stair railing as he lands, paralyzing him and rendering him unconscious. Robby is horrified at the fact that he accidentally crippled Miguel and flees the scene while Sam, Hawk, and a police officer check on an unconscious Miguel. Miguel spends the next two weeks in a coma while Robby is expelled from school and eventually sentenced to juvenile detention for crippling Miguel at the end of the school brawl.

In Season 3, when Miguel wakes up from his coma, he is initially resentful toward Johnny for his predicament about showing mercy to Robby due to accidentally being crippled by Robby at the end of the school brawl. He furiously rebuffs him by tearfully telling him to leave but slowly reconciles with him when Johnny becomes personally involved in his physical rehabilitation. Several people pitch in to pay for Miguel's surgery, Johnny by stealing and pawning a modern art sculpture from his stepfather, Bobby using proceeds from his church, and Miyagi-Do by organizing a car wash fundraiser, although the Cobra Kais decide to initiate hostilities with the Miyagi-Dos by mugging Nathaniel and stealing the proceeds to donate in their own name in retaliation for Robby's actions against Miguel during the school brawl.

Under Johnny's close mentorship, Miguel is able to gain full function of his legs and leaves Cobra Kai for good. Since Johnny has been kicked out of Cobra Kai by Kreese in the wake of the school brawl, he and Miguel open a new martial arts dojo, Eagle Fang, with students Kreese had ejected from Cobra Kai for their perceived weaknesses such as when Bert refuses to feed a live hamster to a snake and Mitch loses a sparring match to Kyler. He also cuts his ties with his Cobra Kai friends after he finds out about the vengeful and aggressive activities they have been doing under Kreese while he was away, particularly Hawk for breaking Demetri's right arm during the laser tag fight, and subsequently breaks up with Tory for picking a fight with Sam and her plan to get revenge on her, as well as not visiting him in the hospital earlier. This act wins over Sam, who resumes her romance with Miguel and gets her father to connect with him when he catches them making out in the Miyagi dojo. Miguel meets Daniel, who is surprised to find common ground with Miguel over their shared upbringings (both came from poor, single-parent families, were bullied by wealthier kids, and found guidance through karate) and agrees to let them continue dating. Miguel (with some help from Sam) manages to save the All-Valley Tournament with a passionate and mature speech and aids Sam in creating an alliance between Eagle Fang and Miyagi-Do, helping them fight off the Cobra Kais when Tory leads them in a gang assault on the LaRusso residence. In the fight, Miguel is singled out for a one-on-one fight with a vengeful Kyler, who seeks payback for the cafeteria fight. Kyler brutally beats Miguel and initially has the upper hand due to Miguel having recently recovered from accidentally being crippled by Robby during the school brawl, but Miguel, remembering all of Johnny's encouragement from when he was hospitalized and quickly defeats Kyler with a takedown counterattack consisting of a roundhouse kick, a back kick, an acrobatic flip, and a final knockout punch. After defeating Kyler, Miguel reconciles his friendship with Hawk and the two alongside Demetri decide to stop Sam and Tory from fighting. Sam and Tory stop fighting before Tory leaves the house she calls both Miguel and Hawk traitors.

Miguel returns to his mother's apartment to tend to his wounds from the fight, which is how Johnny finds him when he shows up at the Diaz apartment seeking to declare his love to Carmen. An enraged Johnny immediately sets out to Cobra Kai to confront Kreese, as does Daniel. Miguel and Sam manage to chase them down, showing up at Cobra Kai just as Daniel is about to finish off Kreese, bringing him and Johnny back to their senses. Miguel and Sam are just as dismayed as Daniel and Johnny to learn that Robby has firmly sided with Kreese. In the aftermath, Johnny and Miguel bring their fellow Eagle Fang students to the Miyagi dojo to help train both dojo's students. His recovery is assumed to be speeding up at this point.

In Season 4, Miguel continues training under both Daniel and Johnny while also continuing his relationship with Sam. Throughout their training, he begins to develop a close friendship with Daniel while taking an appreciation for Miyagi-Do's passive approach toward fighting, much to Johnny's jealousy. He also learns that Johnny is dating his mother, which later leads to friction between him and Johnny, with Johnny starting to treat him differently from the other students and Miguel beginning to spend less time with Johnny. After Eagle Fang and Miyagi Do split, Miguel remains with Johnny and Eagle Fang. He later helps recruit new female students into the new dojo, despite its initial failure. During the junior prom, Miguel and Sam become distracted by Tory and Robby. When he returns home, he finds a drunken Johnny, who explains that he loves Miguel as a son, leading Miguel to shed a tear of happiness that changes to dejection and heartbreak as Johnny calls him Robby instead, straining their relationship, due to Robby taunting Miguel about Johnny using him to compensate for his relationship problems with Robby. During the semifinals, Miguel faces off against Hawk who is going by Eli again and has joined Miyagi-Do. He gains the upper hand but pulls a muscle in his back and falls to the ground. Ultimately, he decides to step down from the match due to his belief that he's no longer fighting for himself, having been pressured by Johnny to return and further straining their relationship. He abruptly leaves the tournament. In a letter to his mother, he reveals that he is heading to Mexico City to find his biological father in order to get answers about who he is and his place in the world. However, unknown to Miguel, Miguel's father is unaware of his existence because Carmen never told him of her pregnancy before she fled.

In Season 5, Miguel meets his father, Hector Salazar, in Ceuta, Mexico only to discover that he has supposedly changed and is married to another woman named Maria and has a son. After rescuing Luis from a speedy car, Maria and Hector invite him to stay with them. There, he learns more about his father's past with Carmen, revealing that Hector has no idea Miguel is his son. The discovery briefly leads Miguel to become angry with Carmen. After learning of Hector's illegal business ventures, Miguel realizes his true nature and leaves Mexico with Johnny (with whom he reconciles). On the other hand, his rivalry with Robby comes to a head when Johnny tries to get the two boys to end their rivalry while his relationship with Sam goes south, due to their own personal issues. After Daniel and Johnny jokingly reminisce that their rivalry may have ended earlier if they had simply fought it out, Johnny makes Miguel and Robby fight each other, in which Miguel gains the upper hand and is poised to kick Robby over the balcony in a similar manner to the school fight. Miguel stops himself and makes amends with Robby. Afterward, Johnny accidentally reveals that Carmen is pregnant (with her and Johnny's child), easing the tensions even more as the boys celebrate their future half-sibling. Meanwhile, Sam decides to take a break from Miguel so that she can resolve her identity crisis. Miguel participates in the final fight at the Cobra Kai dojo in an attempt to expose Terry Silver. During the break-in, Miguel defends Robby from Kenny before Kenny attacks him to ignite the brawl. Miguel arrives to save a helpless Robby and defeats multiple students who managed to gang up on a incapacitated Robby (who was struck by Kenny's "silver bullet"). In the brawl's aftermath and following Terry Silver's arrest, Miguel reconciles with Sam with a kiss and reveals that he loves her.

Samantha LaRusso

Samantha "Sam" LaRusso (Mary Mouser; Reese TinLee as a young child) is Daniel and Amanda's teenage daughter, who was taught karate by her father at a young age. Her relationship with her father is strained by his meddling in her new friendships, but they reconcile after Sam sees Kyler bully Miguel's friend group and subsequently ends their relationship after he tries to grope her in a movie theater. When Kyler begins spreading rumors about her, Sam is left briefly friendless, with Yasmine, Moon and Aisha refusing to allow her to talk to them or to sit with them at lunch. Miguel eventually defends her and defeats Kyler's clique in an all-out fight, impressing her. Sam is smitten with Miguel but feels pressured to keep their relationship a secret from her parents because of her father's negative history with Cobra Kai during the 1984 and 1985 All-Valley Tournaments. A series of assumptions and misunderstandings leads Miguel to believe that Sam is ashamed of him and is involved with Daniel's student and employee and Johnny's estranged son Robby Keene, whom she had befriended earlier. During a party at a beach, Miguel attempts to pick a fight with Robby but accidentally hits Sam instead. Sam is upset with Miguel and breaks up with him. After a second confrontation with Miguel at the All-Valley Tournament, a depressed Sam returns home and resumes her own karate training, although she does reconcile with Aisha after she apologizes to Aisha for her former association with Yasmine and laughs about Yasmine's front wedgie incident.

In Season 2, Sam blocks Miguel from her social media feeds on Instagram and bonds with Robby as they continue their training at Miyagi-Do. However, her friendship with Aisha sours after Daniel indirectly slights Cobra Kai in his Miyagi-Do Karate commercial and Cobra Kai crashes Miyagi-Do Karate's presentation at the Valley Fest in retaliation. She eventually starts a relationship with Robby but continues to have lingering feelings for Miguel. This leads to a heated rivalry between her and Miguel's new girlfriend, Tory Nichols. During a party at Moon's house, Sam beats Tory in a drinking contest, but she ends up in a drinking binge and ends up cheating on Robby with Miguel when he approaches her in private, after learning from Aisha that he had returned Miyagi's Medal of Honor (which Hawk had stolen, and Robby withheld from her), which is noticed by Tory. When the police arrive to break up the party, Robby brings her to Johnny's apartment to sleep off her hangover, infuriating Daniel and causing Daniel to cut ties with Johnny and Robby.

On the first day of school, an enraged and vengeful Tory furiously challenges Sam to a fight in retaliation for the kiss, which sparks a karate war between both Cobra Kai and Miyagi-do members that ends with Robby accidentally kicking Miguel over a balcony railing and sending him falling off the second floor. Despite sustaining broken ribs and injuries during the fight, Sam defeats Tory, but not before Tory manages to slash her right arm with a spiked bracelet while trying to disfigure her face. When Miguel is subsequently and accidentally knocked over a balcony railing by Robby and paralyzed at the end of the school brawl, Sam is one of only two combatants (the other being Hawk) to run to his side. She is hospitalized and when her parents show up, is only concerned about Miguel's well-being and cries about Miguel's injuries accidentally caused by Robby at the end of the school brawl.

In season 3, due to fighting in school, Sam and all the other participants are suspended for two weeks (except for Tory and Robby, who are expelled for their actions against Sam and Miguel, respectively). While Sam has recovered from her physical injuries, she still suffers from post-traumatic stress disorder and survivor's guilt from her confrontation with Tory during the school brawl and watching Miguel's fall accidentally caused by Robby at the end of the school brawl, having regular flashbacks and nightmares. She is also ostracized by most of the student body with the exception of Moon and the Miyagi-Do students.

While Daniel goes on a trip to Japan to save his and his family's dealership, Sam decides to restart Miyagi-Do in response to continued attacks from Cobra Kai, much to her mother's disapproval. To show forgiveness to the enemy, she organizes a car wash fundraiser to pay for Miguel's surgery after she learns from him that his family cannot afford the bills. Hawk's gang takes offense at Miyagi-Do's gesture due to Robby's actions against Miguel at the end of the school brawl and retaliate by mugging Nathaniel and stealing the fundraiser money to donate in their own name. Sam retaliates by encouraging the Miyagi-Dos to foul the Cobra Kais during a soccer match, but Hawk and his gang catch onto them and foul them back, culminating in the referee sending both groups to the principal's office. Sam is enraged when Hawk exploits Counselor Blatt's fixation on political correctness to talk her into letting the Cobra Kais off with no consequences while punishing the Miyagi-Dos twice, yelling "This school sucks!" before storming off, reminiscent of her father.

Sometime later, Hawk's gang decides to harass a Miyagi-Do student, Chris, while he is working at the Golf 'n Stuff. Chris texts Sam, who brings the Miyagi-Dos to ambush the Cobra Kais in the adjacent laser tag arena. The Miyagi-Dos initially have the upper hand until Tory suddenly arrives with reinforcements. She calls out to Sam, who abruptly suffers a panic attack and withdraws from the fight. Frozen in terror, she is helpless to prevent the Cobra Kais from turning the tide of battle and can only watch as Tory and others goad Hawk into breaking Demetri's right arm in retaliation for Robby's actions against Miguel during the school brawl. Sam is confronted by her mother after taking Demetri to the hospital, who stops short of lecturing her again when she breaks into tears and explains what happened, prompting an enraged Amanda to storm into Cobra Kai and slap Kreese.

Sam's PTSD begins to worsen in light of the attack on Demetri, with her nightmares now including one where Tory drowns her in the Miyagi-Do pond. She initially refuses to help her parents when they decide to reopen Miyagi-Do to combat Kreese. Stunned by the rejection, Daniel realizes that he has fallen out of touch with his daughter, and at Amanda's suggestion, takes Sam on a fishing trip. After getting her to open up, he later brings her to the All-Valley Sports Arena, the venue of the All-Valley Tournament, and describes how his fear nearly cost him his victory in his match against Mike Barnes in the 1985 All-Valley Tournament, and how Miyagi's encouragement helped him overcome said fears. Now in better spirits, Sam rejoins Miyagi-Do, training with her father using a new technique she learned from the fishing trip, sparring with bo staffs.

When Miguel returns to school, Sam runs into him in the halls and decides to renew their romance upon learning he has disassociated himself from the Cobra Kais in light of Demetri's injuries caused by a vengeful Hawk during the laser tag fight. When word gets out that the city has canceled the All-Valley Tournament in the wake of the recent karate violence and the school brawl, Sam is outraged, thinking that the tournament is the best means for Miyagi-Do to restore their reputation, which has been tarnished by Robby's actions against Miguel at the end of the school brawl. When Miguel takes the podium to make an impassioned speech to convince the council members to let the tournament go on, she goes to his side to provide moral support.

While celebrating their victory at Miyagi-Do, Sam and Miguel share a toast before engaging in a playful bout of sparring, which soon becomes intimate. However, as they are about to kiss, Robby shows up looking for a place to crash and furiously accuses Sam of dumping him for Miguel the moment he went off to juvie. When Miguel tries to insert himself into their argument to defend Sam, Robby tries to attack him, but Sam steps in and shoves him away. Robby furiously ends his relationship with Sam by sarcastically telling her that she and Miguel deserve each other and storms off to Kreese's Cobra Kai dojo for help, while Sam is left devastated and questioning how well she knew Robby.

The next day, Daniel catches Sam and Miguel making out on the dojo floor in the midst of a friendly sparring session. While embarrassed to be caught, Sam stands her ground and encourages her father to get to know Miguel when he brings up her past failed relationships with Kyler, Miguel, and Robby. After doing so, Daniel gives Sam his blessing for her to continue dating Miguel but half-jokingly warns them to keep their "sparring" to a minimum.

Sam realizes that the best way to defeat Cobra Kai will be to convince their dojos to merge, but this will be difficult when their senseis are at odds with one another. To do this, Sam gathers the Miyagi-Dos at her house under the false pretense of a Christmas keg party while her parents are having a dinner reunion with Ali at the Oaks Country Club and has Miguel bring the students of Eagle Fang over under the same pretense. While Sam has difficulty convincing Miyagi-Do and Eagle Fang to cooperate, Demetri manages to convince Eagle Fang to hear them out by pointing out that their division is exactly what Cobra Kai wants.

The two dojos have finalized a table meeting to discuss the details of their merger when Tory and Kyler lead a gang of Cobra Kai students in an attack on the house at the suggestion of Kreese. Sam initially retreats out of fear of Tory, only to be cornered in Daniel's dojo. Tory kicks Sam to the ground before attacking her with a pair of nunchaku. When Tory breaks a portrait of Mr. Miyagi, however, Sam regains her resolve and fights back with a bo staff, borrowing a lesson Miguel mentioned learning from Johnny that "the best defense is more offense". After a drawn-out duel, Sam is able to disarm Tory and holds her at bay while Miguel, Demetri, and Hawk arrive to help Sam. Tory retreats, but not before telling Sam their fight isn't over.

Realizing her dad is likely on his way to kill Kreese in response to the attack, Sam grabs Miguel and rushes to Cobra Kai, arriving just as Daniel is about to finish off Kreese. Both teenagers are as dismayed as their senseis to find that Robby has firmly sided with Kreese.

In the aftermath of the house fight and Daniel and Johnny's fight with Kreese, Sam and Miguel are seen together training with the other Miyagi-Do and Eagle Fang students to prepare for the tournament against Cobra Kai to determine which dojos will remain in the Valley.

In season 4, Sam continues to train with both dojos, but Daniel becomes concerned about Johnny's influence on her, as she takes a liking his way of fighting more aggressively than passively and starts adopting his mannerisms. When the two dojos split, she remains with Miyagi-Do, but continues to train at Eagle Fang behind Daniel's back. During the finals, Sam fights against Tory once again using only one style at a time which proves to be insufficient, so Daniel encourages his daughter to fight her own way, even if it means going on the offense. Sam's combination of offense and defense allows her to hold her own against Tory who is caught by surprise, but hits Sam in the eye, limiting her vision. Tory's hit on Sam is a genuine accident, but the referee refuses to call her out on it. Tory wins the fight fairly otherwise despite Silver's encouragement to cheat and much to Sam's surprise, Tory expresses genuine concern over Sam's injuries afterwards, having apparently agreed to honor Amanda's request that she end her rivalry with Sam once and for all. Unknown to everyone except for Tory, Silver had secretly bribed the referee to favor Cobra Kai which is the real reason why Tory didn't get a point deduction for hitting Sam in the eye and the referee had used an excuse to not give Sam a point earlier in the match. Nevertheless, Sam is still devastated about how she could've lost, despite all her hard work.

In season 5, Sam experiences an identity crisis after her loss at the All-Valley tournament. To find out who she is, Sam goes on a spa day with Moon and Yasmine in order to find out who she really is, in which she confronts her own past, including a dark version of herself. She decides to take a break from Miguel after he returns from Mexico. After Silver humiliates Daniel in a fight, she along with her mother and fellow Miyagi-Do students encourage him to fight back. During the Sekai Taikai tryouts, Sam fights Devon after Tory flees the dojo. Despite the referee being bribed in Cobra Kai's favor, Sam manages to beat Devon, resulting in Miyagi-Do and Eagle Fang being invited in along with Cobra Kai. Sam later finds out from Tory that Silver had rigged their match in Cobra Kai's favor, leaving Sam furious. She eventually comes to a truce with Tory after witnessing her mother's sickness, with Tory admitting she felt like a fraud after learning Silver fixed their match. Sam and Tory, along with the students of both Miyagi-Do and Eagle Fang form a plan to try and expose Silver to the Cobra Kai students after finding out that Stingray had been assaulted by him. The students end up fighting off Cobra Kai after Mitch exposes their plan. During the ensuing brawl, Sam defends Tory from Kim Da-eun. After Silver and Cobra Kai's defeat, Sam and Miguel reconcile, admitting their love for each other and kiss.

Anthony LaRusso
Anthony LaRusso (Griffin Santopietro) (Ant for shorten) is Daniel and Amanda's son and Samantha's younger brother. He is rather spoiled, demanding, and spends the majority of his time playing video games. Anthony refuses to learn karate from his father, finding it boring. It is revealed during the show that he was an unintended pregnancy after what was supposed to be a sparring session between Daniel and Amanda. 

Anthony is sent to summer camp throughout Season 2, presumably being pressured by his father to do something productive rather than playing video games.

In Season 3, Anthony is thinner and appears to play soccer.

In Season 4, Daniel tries to teach Anthony in the ways of Miyagi-Do, but is disappointed and gives up on him when he finds out he went behind his back and paid someone from TaskRabbit to do the waxing technique for him. Anthony later gradually warms up to Miyagi-Do after Daniel tells him a story about Anthony and Mr. Miyagi when Anthony is looking at a karate scroll that Chozen gave Daniel. He eventually confesses to Daniel that he is jealous everyone else in his family had more memories with Mr. Miyagi than he did and feels left out. Meanwhile, at school, Anthony and his friends bully a new kid named Kenny Payne up to the point where he enrolls in Cobra Kai, with Anthony catfishing him online to trick him into cosplaying and even going so far as to steal Kenny’s clothes during gym class to embarrass him at one point. Daniel and Amanda are horrified when they eventually find out about Anthony's misconduct after Anthony and his friends get suspended for bullying Kenny in the library and ground him. Daniel subsequently strikes discipline into him after furiously breaking an iPad he had snuck into his room while being grounded and forbidden from using technology. After a failed apology at school, Anthony attempts to apologize to Kenny again during the All-Valley tournament for his actions after Kenny loses his match to Robby in a locker room, but is pulverized by Kenny before Robby calls him off. A vengeful Kenny then tells Anthony that he will continue to harass him as they begin high school before leaving. Robby asks Anthony if he is okay and tries to help him but Anthony rebuffs Robby’s attempts to help him and later returns home disappointed that Cobra Kai won the All-Valley Tournament again.

In Season 5, Anthony is bullied and physically harassed by the vengeful Kenny and his Cobra Kai gang, at one point being kicked into a pool and given a swirly. Finally conceding he needs to learn to defend himself, he accepts Sam's offer of joining Miyagi-Do. During training to protect eggs, when the students fail, Anthony suggests the students work together as a team against Chozen to defend the eggs, which succeeds. Anthony later plays a major role in the defeat of Cobra Kai, joining the others in breaking into the dojo where Demetri and Hawk hack into the Cobra Kai server and steal the security footage of Terry Silver confessing to bribing the tournament referee so that Cobra Kai would win. During the brawl that follows, the tablet with the footage falls into Anthony's hands. While Miyagi-Do and Eagle Fang defend him using the egg technique, Anthony uploads the footage onto Cobra Kai's YouTube channel and plays it on the dojo's TV for the Cobra Kai students to see. After Silver's defeat by Daniel, the evidence uncovered by the students as well as Stingray confessing the truth about Silver's attack on him causes Silver to be arrested on a litany of charges while Silver's students abandon him.

Carmen Diaz
Carmen Diaz (Vanessa Rubio) is Miguel's mother and works at a hospital as an X-ray technologist. She married at age 18 but left her husband after learning that he was making money doing illicit activities. Carmen (then pregnant with Miguel) and her mother Rosa fled Ecuador to seek safety in America. The trio has moved frequently and was living in Riverside before moving to Reseda. Carmen opposes violence, and it takes some convincing by Johnny for her to allow Miguel to continue with his training. Carmen is nervous and worried about Miguel being hurt or losing during the All-Valley karate championship, but she and Rosa attend the tournament to cheer for him.

In Season 2, Johnny starts developing feelings for Carmen but discovers that she is dating a British man named Graham. One night at a bar, while having drinks with a Tinder date, Johnny overhears Graham not taking his relationship with Carmen seriously and confronts him to end the relationship. A few days later, Johnny takes Carmen out on a date at a Mexican restaurant, unaware that Daniel and Amanda are also having their date there. As Johnny and Daniel's animosity for each other cools down, Carmen teaches Johnny how to dance. After Miguel is severely injured by Robby in the brawl at West Valley High, Carmen breaks up with Johnny.

In Season 3, Carmen and Johnny reconcile when the latter becomes physically involved in helping with Miguel's rehabilitation but has her reservations about Miguel training again. Despite this, when the All-Valley Tournament is in danger of being terminated, Carmen urges Johnny to save it after realizing how much the tournament has helped both Miguel and Johnny. After Miguel and Sam save the All-Valley Tournament, Carmen and Johnny rekindle their relationship and sleep together at one point, with the pair uncertain about it becoming serious due to how it could affect Johnny's relationship with Miguel.

In Season 4, Carmen continues her relationship with Johnny, but decides to take it slow. They eventually reveal this to Miguel, who has already deduced this after finding Johnny's headband in her room, causing a strain between her and Miguel, who is upset with the fact that they hid their relationship from him. Later she finds out, after the All-Valley Karate Tournament, that Miguel is leaving to find his father in Mexico, and she reveals that Miguel's father is oblivious to his existence because she never told him about Miguel. Carmen pleads to Johnny to bring him home, which he promises to do so.

In Season 5, Robby and Johnny succeed in bringing Miguel home and Carmen is discovered to be pregnant with Johnny's child.

Rosa Diaz
Rosa Diaz "Yaya" (Rose Bianco) is Miguel's grandmother and Carmen's mother. Though she understands and speaks some English, she mostly speaks in Spanish throughout the series. Unlike Carmen, Rosa is supportive of Miguel's karate training. This extends to protecting Miguel from his mother finding out that he was involved in a fight with Kyler's gang at school and defending Johnny when Carmen blames him for Miguel being crippled by Robby during the school brawl. In Season 3, she pleads with Johnny to stay behind for Miguel's surgery as moral support, causing him to miss out on his juvie visit with Bobby and Robby. In Season 4, she is fully supportive of Carmen and Johnny's romantic relationship as shown when she catches them kissing in front of her.

Robby Keene

Robert Swayze "Robby" Keene (Tanner Buchanan) is Johnny's 17 year old estranged teenage son.

In season 1, Robby drops out of school when he gets in trouble for drugs, after which he and his friends Cruz and Trey spend their days engaged in petty theft as seen when they are stealing laptops from Tech Town. Johnny tries to reconcile with him at the apartment he lives at with his single mother, but he rebuffs him. To spite his father for neglecting him in favor of Miguel, Robby begins working at LaRusso Auto Group. Despite his original ulterior motive, Robby grows to appreciate Daniel's faith in him and turns against Cruz and Trey when they try to rob the dealership by fighting them off with his newfound karate skills and a security camera. Robby becomes Daniel's Miyagi-Do karate student and flourishes under this tutelage. However, when Daniel finds out that Johnny and Robby are father and son after Johnny shoves Daniel and breaks one of his All-Valley trophies, Daniel furiously banishes Robby from his home and business as punishment for his deception. Undaunted by this rejection, Robby enters the All-Valley tournament with no affiliation and advances towards the finals, impressing Daniel. This, combined with Amanda's encouragement to forgive Robby and Robby's apology for hiding the fact that he is Johnny's son, convinces Daniel to reconcile with Robby, officially become Robby's sensei again and allow Robby to fight under the Miyagi-Do name during the final match against Miguel. Robby sustains a shoulder injury from Hawk's illegal attack during the semifinals and ultimately finishes second to Miguel, who exploits Robby's shoulder injury to win a close match. Impressed with Robby's performance and disgusted with his students' increasingly thuggish behavior, Johnny apologizes to Robby, who politely accepts it, implying that Robby still cares about Johnny somewhat despite their strained relationship. Regardless of this loss, Daniel praises Robby's performance and takes him to Mr. Miyagi's old rest house to explain his plans to restart the Miyagi-Do dojo with Robby as his senior protégé.

In Season 2, Robby moves in with the LaRussos after his mother Shannon abandons him and leaves with her boyfriend Rick to go on vacation to Mexico, and is evicted from their apartment due to unpaid bills. He and Sam bond closely while training and enter a short relationship, but the relationship is short-lived because she cheats on him with Miguel while they are attending Moon's party due to Sam finding out from Aisha that Miguel returned Miyagi's Medal of Honor to Robby, which had been stolen by Hawk. After Robby takes Sam to Johnny's apartment after getting drunk at a party, Daniel furiously accuses Robby of following the footsteps of his father and cuts ties with Johnny and Robby. With his mother in rehab and his relationship with Daniel tarnished, Robby is forced to live with Johnny, and the pair slowly start to reconcile. During the karate war between the Cobra Kai and Miyagi-Do students at school, Robby once again gets into a fight with Miguel, who taunts him by mocking his relationship problems with Johnny and Sam. After a lengthy fight, Miguel eventually traps Robby in an arm lock and nearly decides to break his arm to end the school brawl once and for all but decides to let go of him after remembering Johnny's advice of showing mercy. However, Robby, furious with Miguel for taunting him about his relationship problems with Johnny and Sam, having a better relationship with his estranged father Johnny than he ever did and taking advantage of Sam at Moon's party, furiously retaliates by kicking Miguel over the balcony railing, accidentally sending him falling off the second floor and crashing spine-first on a stair handrail, paralyzing him and rendering him unconscious. Shocked and horrified at the fact that he accidentally crippled Miguel, Robby flees the scene while Sam, Hawk, and a police officer check on an unconscious Miguel.

In season 3, Robby is subsequently expelled from West Valley High School for crippling Miguel at the end of the school brawl and goes into hiding as a wanted fugitive for several weeks, stealing a used Dodge Grand Caravan from the LaRusso dealership and living out of a homeless camp. After chasing down several leads, Daniel discovers that a devastated Robby is visiting his mother Shannon in rehab to seek comfort and support and arranges to have the police arrest him, believing that Robby will get a lighter sentence if he surrenders. As the police arrive and interrupt Daniel while he is trying to convince Robby to agree to the plan for a lighter sentence, Robby gets apprehended and angrily accuses Daniel of betraying him and ends their friendship by coldly ordering Daniel not to visit him in juvenile hall. During his incarceration at Sylmar Juvenile Detention Center, Robby feels abandoned when Johnny misses a scheduled visit to provide moral support to Miguel's family during his surgery and subsequently cuts ties with Johnny and is bullied by an inmate, Shawn Payne. Kreese takes advantage of Johnny's neglect to visit Robby, and upon finding out that an inmate is bullying Robby, suggests that Robby adapts to the Cobra Kai mentality of striking first. Taking Kreese's lessons to heart, Robby gains the upper hand on Shawn, winning his respect after he admits to not snitching. Around mid-December, Robby is released from juvie, but rebuffs both Daniel and Johnny when they arrive to pick him up due to his resentment towards them. After discovering Sam and Miguel are together again at the Miyagi-Do dojo, Robby furiously accuses Sam of dumping him for Miguel after he was sentenced to juvenile hall. With nowhere else to go, Robby furiously ends his relationship with Samantha and goes to Cobra Kai, where Kreese agrees to take him in. Robby is initially reluctant to join Cobra Kai due to Hawk's resentment toward him for his actions against Miguel at the end of the school brawl, but Tory convinces him to stay with Cobra Kai. The two soon befriend each other and find common ground in each other's broken home lives as well as their own betrayals from Johnny, Sam, and Miguel. As the newest member of Cobra Kai, Robby proves himself to Kreese and the rest of the Cobra Kai students (except for Hawk) after stealing a snake from the zoo.

While Tory leads the Cobra Kais that night in an attack on the LaRusso house, Kreese keeps Robby behind at the dojo to train him. When Johnny shows up at the dojo to confront Kreese over the attack on Miguel, he is horrified to see Robby wearing a Cobra Kai gi. Robby offers Johnny to re-join Kreese in Cobra Kai, but Johnny rejects, and attacks Kreese. Robby steps in and defends Kreese and engages in a fight against Johnny after angrily venting on the past about how Johnny was never there for Robby when he needed him. Robby is then unintentionally knocked out by Johnny who reluctantly pushes him into a set of lockers after trying to reason with him to no avail. Daniel joins the fray, and he and Johnny defeat Kreese before Miguel and Sam intervene to talk them out of killing him. When Robby regains consciousness, he coldly orders Daniel, Johnny, Miguel, and Sam to leave before continuing his training with Kreese.

In season 4, he aids Kreese and Terry Silver with leading the Cobra Kais by training them in Miyagi-Do techniques so that they can better counter Miyagi-Do and Eagle Fang. He also starts a romantic relationship with Tory and recruits a young student named Kenny Payne, Shawn's younger brother whom he mentors due to him struggling to fit in at school and dealing with bullies including Daniel's son Anthony LaRusso. Robby confronts Johnny about the bullying and tells him if the bullying doesn't stop, he will be forced to put an end to it himself. During the tournament, Robby is forced to fight Kenny in the boys' quarterfinals, easily defeating him. In the boys' finals, after Miguel chooses not to return, Robby faces off against Hawk, who has returned to using his original name, Eli, and is allied with Miyagi-Do. As they both know the Cobra Kai and Miyagi-Do techniques, Robby and Eli fight to a draw, leading to a sudden death overtime. Ultimately, Eli defeats Robby and becomes the All-Boys champion after Robby hesitates to finish him off when Kenny cheers for him from the sidelines. Later, at the now-abandoned Cobra Kai dojo, Robby tearfully breaks down and admits he's tired of blaming Johnny for his problems and begins reconnecting with him, having become disturbed and horrified after witnessing Kenny pulverizing a helpless Anthony before his final match with Eli because of becoming corrupted by Cobra Kai. This makes him realize what his anger had turned him into as he failed to prevent Kenny from going down the same path.

In season 5, Robby joins his father in going to Mexico to find Miguel, which they succeed, but the two boys remain at odds with each other due to their negative past history. After Johnny reminisces with Daniel about how their own rivalry might've ended much earlier if they'd just fought it out, Johnny has Robby and Miguel fight it out with each other, ending with Miguel poised to send Robby over a railing, the same as Robby did to him during the school brawl. Miguel backs off and he and Robby finally make amends with each other and Johnny accidentally reveals to the two that Carmen is pregnant with their future half-sibling, much to the joy of both boys. Subsequently, Miguel and Robby become friends and Robby defects from Cobra Kai to rejoin Miyagi-Do in their fight against Cobra Kai. As a result, Tory breaks up with him while Kenny angrily ends their friendship. During the fight at the flagship Cobra Kai dojo, he reluctantly fights a vengeful Kenny who wins by using the "silver bullet" to incapacitate him but is saved by Miguel. After Silver is taken down, Robby tries to talk to a saddened Kenny, but the latter requests to be left alone and leaves in shame due to being depressed about feeling betrayed by Silver. He resumes his romantic relationship with Tory with a kiss after Tory reassures him that Kenny will come through and apologizes for her past mistakes.

Shannon Keene
Shannon Keene (Diora Baird) is Johnny's ex-girlfriend and Robby's mother. She is shown to be rather very neglectful of her son, barely noticing him effectively dropping out of school or his criminal behavior. Shannon resents both Johnny's absence and his attempts to be present as seen by the fact that Robby goes by his mother's last name as his legal name instead of Johnny's last name. She is also an alcoholic and spends most of her time at bars, hoping to find a rich man to marry her.

In Season 2, Shannon leaves Robby alone in their apartment to spend the summer with a boyfriend in Cabo San Lucas. Her boyfriend assures him that he has paid the rent and the utility bills, but he did not, forcing Robby to move to the LaRussos' home after receiving an eviction notice. By the end of summer, Shannon shows up at the LaRussos' home, begging Robby for forgiveness for all the mistakes she has made over the years, and decides to check herself into rehab. She also recommends that Robby seek out Johnny, as both his parents care for him.

In Season 3, Shannon is in a rehab facility where Daniel and Johnny visit her to ask where Robby may be hiding. During their search, Robby visits her to seek comfort and support due to being devastated about the aftermath of his fight with Miguel during the school brawl, and Shannon tips off Daniel, who arranges for the police to show up. After Robby ends his friendship with Daniel due to feeling betrayed by him, Shannon tearfully comforts Robby while the police escort him out of the rehab facility.

In Season 4, Shannon informs Johnny that Terry Silver loaned Robby a car for the prom and gave her money, offering her a new home and a job. Seeing this as a repeat of his childhood, Johnny confronts Silver at the former Cobra Kai dojo.

In Season 5, Shannon arrives at Johnny's apartment to pick up Robby to spend the summer with her parents. She later helps Johnny find a new job as an Uber rideshare driver after deducing that he got Carmen pregnant. Later, Shannon lets Robby stay at Johnny's apartment after realizing that he wants a second chance as a father.

Sid Weinberg
Sid Weinberg (Ed Asner in S1 eps. 1 and 8 and S3 
ep. 3; Michael H. Cole as the younger 1970s Sid in S1 ep. 6) is Johnny Lawrence's stepfather and a retired film producer. While Sid loved Johnny's now-deceased mother, Laura, he disliked Johnny and made no secret of the fact that he despised having to support Johnny financially. Sid's outlet for this support was a relationship with Johnny that was based entirely on verbal abuse, making Johnny's well-to-do life in Encino psychologically unbearable. It was this troubled relationship with Sid that led Johnny to turn to both Cobra Kai as an alternative family, and to Kreese as an alternative father figure (who would ultimately replicate Sid's pattern of abuse).

Because Sid promised Laura on her deathbed that he would support Johnny, he perpetually had to bail him out of trouble with the law. After a resentful Sid reluctantly bails Johnny out after the fight with Kyler and his gang, Sid offers Johnny a check with an undisclosed sum of money to disown him and buy him out of his life, which Johnny initially tears up and rejects, saying he would rather die homeless than accept money from his stepfather. However, when Johnny realizes he needs funds to build his dojo, he tapes the check back together and uses the money to rent vacant space in a Reseda strip mall. By the middle of Season 1, when Cobra Kai becomes a successful business, Johnny returns all of the money to Sid and vows never to return.

Though Sid does not appear in season 2, he is mentioned in a flashback when a teenage Johnny is crying to Kreese about being verbally abused by Sid. An unsympathetic Kreese coldly retorts by telling Johnny to stop crying and ordering him to chant that he is a winner.

In Season 3, Johnny approaches Sid to help fund Miguel's surgery and even resorts to blackmailing Sid for an undisclosed sexual harassment incident involving his secretary, only for Sid to rebuff him without remorse. In retaliation, Johnny steals one of Sid's valuable art sculptures and pawns it to pay for Miguel's surgery.

Although Sid does not appear in season 4, he is mentioned in a flashback when Laura tells young Johnny that she is getting married to Sid.

Laura Lawrence
Laura Lawrence (Candace Moon) is Johnny Lawrence's mother and Robby's grandmother. Although she married Sid to give Johnny a comfortable lifestyle, Johnny is miserable living with his stepfather. He was very close to his mother, who died shortly before Robby was born in 2002. In Season 4, she appears in a brief flashback where she discovers that Johnny is hiding mementos of her ex-husband. She takes it away and demands to accept Sid as his "new father".

 Eli Moskowitz 

Eli "Hawk" Moskowitz (Jacob Bertrand) is Demetri's best friend and one of Miguel's high school friends. He is a victim of cyberbullying due to his cleft lip surgery scar. Eli is initially quiet, shy and sensitive, and he is told by doctors that he may be on the autism spectrum. He joins Cobra Kai, where Johnny nicknames him "Lip" due to his scar, but he takes Johnny's advice of "flipping the script" and undergoes an attitude change. He  cuts his hair into a mohawk, gets a hawk with a mohawk tattooed on his back, developing a much more aggressive and rather antagonistic personality, and is dubbed Hawk by Johnny. In the All-Valley Tournament, Hawk is disqualified in the semi-finals for dishonorably attacking Robby from behind in retaliation for Robby making fun of his mohawk right before the finals round begins in a very similar fashion to Bobby from the first film; unlike Bobby, Hawk is unapologetic for his actions.

In season 2, Hawk is reprimanded by Johnny for his actions during the tournament, but he becomes more aggressive and forms his own gang with some of the newer students. Hawk's friendship with Demetri crumbles after the latter joins Miyagi-Do and posts a negative review of Cobra Kai on Yelp. Demetri is confronted by Hawk and his gang at the mall, but they are stopped by Sam and Robby. In the aftermath of the mall fight, Moon breaks up with Hawk, disgusted with his bullying behavior against Demetri. Encouraged by Kreese, Hawk and his gang vandalize the Miyagi-do Karate dojo and Daniel's prized 1948 Ford Super DeLuxe convertible, stealing Mr. Miyagi's Medal of Honor in the process. During a training exercise in Coyote Creek, Miguel learns of Hawk's crimes and defeats him in a match, taking the medal with him and returning it to Daniel via Robby. During a party at Moon's house, Demetri makes an effort to reconnect and is initially successful, but is rebuffed and humiliated when Hawk pours booze over his head. A vengeful Demetri subsequently retaliates by giving a public roast in which he outs Hawk as a bedwetter, causing a standoff between the rival students that is diffused when the police break up the party.

On the first day of school, Hawk takes advantage of a scuffle with Tory and Sam and a scuffle between Miguel and Robby to incite a gang fight between the dojos. In the chaos, Hawk targets Demetri in retaliation for roasting him and outing him as a bedwetter at Moon's party, but is defeated by him when Demetri outsmarts him by kicking him and sending him crashing into a trophy case. Following the fight, Hawk turns against Johnny and sides with Kreese when he takes over Cobra Kai, openly blaming Johnny for Miguel's life-threatening injuries accidentally caused by Robby at the end of the school brawl.

Upon his return to school in season 3, Hawk continues his antagonistic streak but becomes increasingly conflicted with his loyalty to Cobra Kai as Kreese slowly removes the remaining holdouts from Johnny's Cobra Kai, first when he expels Bert and several other students who refuse to feed a hamster to a snake, and later when he approaches Kyler and Brucks to try out for spots in the dojo, with the former replacing Mitch and the latter being subject to a vicious beating from Hawk. In addition, Hawk is pressured into breaking Demetri's right arm during a gang fight with Miyagi-Do at the laser tag park where Chris works, which he does with some obvious reluctance, costing him his friendship with Miguel when Miguel finds out about it. When Kreese recruits Robby to Cobra Kai, Hawk adamantly and furiously disapproves of him being enrolled in Cobra Kai due to his actions against Miguel during the school brawl, but Kreese shows no sympathy. While at the zoo to steal a Chinese Cobra for Kreese, Hawk, Tory, Kyler, Robby, and several other students are chased out, thinking that they have failed due to Kyler forgetting the snake pole, but Robby returns with the snake, earning him the respect of the rest of the Cobra Kai students except for Hawk.

After being chastised over his behavior by both Miguel and Johnny, as well as realizing the errors of Kreese's teachings, along with the fact that Kreese indeed didn't care about him or anyone else as seen when he recruited Kyler and Robby to Cobra Kai, Hawk realizes his mistakes and redeems himself by breaking away from Cobra Kai during Tory's assault on the LaRusso residence, coming to Demetri's defense and reconciling with Demetri. Using a variant of the wheel technique that had been used against Hawk by Sam and Robby in the mall fight, Hawk and Demetri, alongside Miguel, are able to take down the remaining Cobra Kai students, forcing them to retreat. A vengeful Tory threateningly warns Hawk to watch his back, but Demetri retorts that he's got friends that stand by Hawk's side. Hawk reconciles with Miguel and Johnny and joins Eagle Fang Karate. When Miyagi-Do and Eagle Fang subsequently begin training together to defeat Cobra Kai, Hawk and Demetri stand together as they start.

In season 4, Hawk continues to train with both Miyagi-Do and Eagle Fang, and eventually rekindles his romance with Moon. Despite having turned his back on Cobra Kai, he is turned down by his allies for his transgressions, but eventually earns their respect by building a new sparring deck in the Miyagi Do dojo. Later, his mohawk is shaved off by Cobra Kai as revenge for the Miyagi Do and Eagle Fang students humiliating them at a drive-in event as well as for betraying them during the house fight. As a result, he loses his confidence and briefly quits karate altogether due to being depressed about not having his mohawk to compensate for his cleft lip scar. When the two dojos split once again, Hawk goes back to being Eli and joins Miyagi Do, at Demetri's insistence rather than remaining with Eagle Fang. He eventually regains his confidence, realizing that his true confidence came from himself, allowing him to easily defeat Kyler in the quarterfinals. In the boys' tournament finals, after Miguel forfeits his match, Eli fights Robby to a draw due to their knowledge of both Cobra Kai and Miyagi-Do techniques, resulting in sudden-death overtime. However, Eli's combination of offense and defense, rather than his previous style of all aggressive offense as well as having gained balance, allows him to emerge victorious over a distracted Robby, becoming the All-Boys champion for Miyagi-Do in the tournament.

In season 5, Eli continues to remain a part of Miyagi-Do and his relationship with Moon while growing a new mohawk. During the Sekai Taikai tryout match, Eli fights Kenny and decides to become Hawk again. Despite this, Hawk is defeated by Kenny, who uses the illegal "silver bullet" technique, forcing him to forfeit the match. After Tory switches sides, the Miyagi-Dos and Eagle Fangs work together to break into Cobra Kai where Hawk and Demetri hack into the servers and steal the security footage of Terry Silver confessing to bribing the tournament referee. During the ensuing fight, Kyler taunts Hawk over his loss to Kenny, but rebuffs it by calling Kyler out for being a bully. The two upload it to the Cobra Kai YouTube channel with Hawk sending the computer to Anthony LaRusso to finish the job during the brawl that follows while he and Demetri join the fight. Silver is exposed and arrested while the Cobra Kais abandon him.

Aisha Robinson
Aisha Robinson (Nichole Brown) is Samantha LaRusso's best childhood friend and later one of Miguel's friends in Cobra Kai. She is the daughter of a hall of fame linebacker for the San Diego Chargers. Even though Aisha comes from a wealthy family, she is left out by Yasmine's clique due to her size and intellectual personality. Her friendship with Sam becomes strained when the latter joins Yasmine's clique and Aisha becomes an object of ridicule in school after Yasmine posts a fat shaming video of her during the Halloween dance. As a result, Aisha becomes the target of relentless bullying at school. In response, she attempts to enroll at Cobra Kai, but Johnny tells her that the dojo does not allow women. Her friend Miguel, however, convinces him to reconsider, as the dojo needs more students and Aisha's family is loaded. Johnny quickly warms up to Aisha after seeing her powerful attack against Miguel, calling her a "natural Cobra". When Sam becomes an outcast due to Kyler spreading rumors and lies about her, Aisha is unsympathetic and refuses to allow Sam to sit with her at lunch due to her resentment towards Sam's failure to stand up for her earlier.

Later, upon learning online that Yasmine is hosting a birthday party at the canyon park, Aisha gets everyone she knows in school to attend before Yasmine and her clique arrives, thus ending Yasmine's control of the gathering. During the party, a vengeful Aisha further exacts her revenge on Yasmine by giving her a front wedgie. Later, during the quarterfinals at the All-Valley Tournament, Aisha is depressed after she is eliminated early by Xander Stone but earns back Sam's respect. Sam apologizes to Aisha for her former association with Yasmine, and they share a laugh about Yasmine's front wedgie incident. Sam is later inspired by Aisha to get back into karate training.

In Season 2, Aisha has gotten in better shape, and her parents have praised Johnny for helping her follow her father's athletic footsteps. Aisha's friendship with Sam becomes strained again when Daniel insults Cobra Kai in his Miyagi-do Karate commercial, and Cobra Kai crashes Miyagi-do Karate's presentation at the Valley Fest. Aisha becomes close friends with Tory and is angered when Sam accuses Tory of stealing her mother's wallet (actually the work of Robby's former friends Trey and Cruz). A reconciliation is made when Aisha apologizes for the trashing of the Miyagi-Do dojo, also revealing to Sam in the process that Miguel recaptured Mr. Miyagi's stolen Medal of Honor from Hawk and returned it to Robby (a fact Robby lied to Sam about earlier, as he suspected being truthful would reignite her feelings for Miguel). Aisha is noticeably absent at Cobra Kai when Kreese seizes the dojo from Johnny after Miguel is accidentally crippled by Robby during the school brawl, implying that she did not approve of Kreese's takeover of Cobra Kai from Johnny. It is also shown that Aisha, unlike the other Cobra Kais, attempted to break up the fight between Sam and Tory until she was provoked by a Miyagi Do student.

At the start of season 3, Moon says that Aisha left their school. After the school fight, her parents withdrew her and transferred her to a private school, also selling their house in the process. Yasmine is pleased due to her resentment towards Aisha over the front wedgie incident, though she tempers her satisfaction when Moon brings up that Sam is not taking Aisha's departure well.

In season 4, Sam visits Aisha in Santa Barbara about advice on dealing with Tory. She has quit karate altogether, but has retained her lessons from Cobra Kai. She recounts about how at her new school, she met a girl that gave her a suspicious glare. Aisha reveals she "struck first" by introducing herself and that they became friends since then. She advises Sam to use her better judgement and not resort to violence, when dealing with Tory being back in school.

Demetri Alexopoulos
Demetri Alexopoulos (Gianni Decenzo) is Eli's best friend and binary brother, and a member of Miguel's high school friend group. He is a very sarcastic and underconfident nerd and has a fixed mindset towards physical activities. It is shown that he has feelings for Yasmine, the leader of the popular girls, and jokes that he'd kill Miguel and Eli to be with her. Demetri quits on his first day of Cobra Kai training after Johnny bodyslams him for mouthing off, but he continues to support Miguel. He is shocked and confused about how Hawk's change of style suddenly turned his life around. Hawk explains that it's not him alone changing his style, rather it being this new attitude he's developed, advising Demetri to do the same. Upon hearing this, he attempts to talk to Yasmine, his crush, but it fails. At the end of the tournament, he tells Miguel that he is considering rejoining Cobra Kai.

In Season 2, Demetri attempts to rejoin Cobra Kai, but Kreese punches him in the face after he makes unflattering comments on his arm tattoo and then touches it. As a result, Demetri joins Miyagi-Do, and also posts a negative review of Cobra Kai on Yelp in response to Kreese's actions, earning him Hawk's wrath. He tests Daniel's patience with his whininess, neuroticism and numerous excuses about his weak arms and legs. Demetri struggles to learn the ways of karate but gets a confidence boost after Daniel tells him that he has the gift of anticipation and intelligence, which slightly increases his confidence. During a party at Moon's house, Demetri attempts to reconcile with Hawk, but Hawk responds by dumping his drink on Demetri, already enraged by Moon moving on with another girl. Later in the party, a vengeful Demetri does a public roast of Hawk in front of all of the guests, revealing embarrassing stories from their childhood and outing Hawk as a bedwetter. During the student rumble at school, Demetri initially tries to avoid participating in the fight by summoning a teacher, but when the teacher retreats out of fear of injury, he is reluctantly forced to take on Hawk. After a short fight, Demetri outsmarts an overconfident Hawk by kicking him and sending him crashing backwards into a trophy case.

In Season 3, Demetri's newfound confidence causes his popularity among classmates to rise, and he eventually enters into a romantic relationship with Yasmine. He continues as part of Miyagi-Do and continues to suffer bullying from an increasingly repentant Hawk, with Hawk breaking Demetri's right arm at one point, albeit with some reluctance. When given the chance to break Demetri's arm again during the brawl at the end of the season, Hawk instead comes to his best friend's defense and reconciles with Demetri. Demetri and Hawk then fight side by side against the Cobra Kai students, taking down several together. When a defeated Tory threatens Hawk for abandoning Cobra Kai, Demetri stands up to her in defense of Hawk. Shortly thereafter, Miyagi-Do and Eagle Fang begin training together to take down Cobra Kai and the reconciled Hawk and Demetri stand together.

In Season 4, Demetri continues his relationship with Yasmine as well as his mended friendship with Hawk, being the only one to truly forgive him for his previous actions. When Miyagi-Do and Eagle Fang split, he stays with Miyagi-Do. After Hawk gets his mohawk shaved off by Cobra Kai and loses his confidence, Hawk quits karate due to being depressed about not having his Mohawk to compensate for his cleft lip scar but Demetri insists that he stay and join Miyagi-Do, reassuring him that he will always be his friend, no matter what. In the tournament semi finals, Demetri loses to Robby, but is able put up a fight against him before his defeat, earning him praise from Daniel and the Miyagi-Dos.

In Season 5, Demetri gives Miguel advice on his relationship with Sam. He later joins the Miyagi-Fang students in exposing Terry Silver as a fraud. During the ensuing brawl, Demetri and Eli hack into the Cobra Kai YouTube server, uploading footage of Tory getting Silver to confess he bribed the referee during the All-Valley. He later defeats Kyler as payback for bullying him, the latest of his victims to do so.

Bert
Bert (Owen Morgan) is a diminutive junior student of Cobra Kai. On the day of the All Valley Under-18 Karate Championships tournament, he tells his teammates that he saw a drunk Johnny rambling due to being depressed about discovering his high school rival Daniel LaRusso teaching his estranged son Robby Keene Miyagi-Do karate, urinating on his own car and yelling, "We are all gonna die!", but he never thought of telling them earlier because he thought it was a normal way for Johnny to act. Bert is eliminated in the first round, but Johnny and the other Cobra Kai students remark Bert was horribly outmatched as he was facing a much bigger opponent. He is also seen with all the Cobra Kai students mixing concrete as punishment from Johnny for the overconfident attitude of his class in wake of winning the tournament. When Samantha and Robby attend an end-of-summer party hosted by Moon, they are shocked to see all the Cobra Kai students there, even Bert. Moon reveals she invited all Cobras and Miyagi-Do students in an unsuccessful attempt to foster peace between the dojos.

During the school brawl at the end of Season 2, Bert fights Nate, a former Cobra Kai student who defected to Miyagi-Do, until both boys are taken away from the hallway by one of the security guards.

Early in season 3, Kreese expels Bert and a bunch of other students from Cobra Kai after he displays hesitation at feeding a hamster to a snake. Miguel recruits Bert and the other outcasts from Cobra Kai into Johnny's new dojo, Eagle Fang Karate. After Miyagi-Do and Eagle Fang begin training together to take down Cobra Kai, Bert and Nathaniel shake hands before standing together.

In Season 4, Bert is now best friends with Nate, and they bully Kenny Payne upon learning he is in Cobra Kai due to their resentment towards Cobra Kai. When the two dojos split, Bert remains with Eagle Fang. In the tournament, he is quickly defeated once again, but not before landing a point and putting up a fight. In Season 5, Bert continues to train with Eagle Fang.

Kyler Park
Kyler Park (Joe Seo) is a high school boy from a wealthy Korean-American family originally from Irvine. He is very Americanized and retains little connection to his Korean heritage. One night, he and his gang bully Miguel and call him Rhea because he has a bottle of Pepto-Bismol in his hand for his grandma and he accidentally thwarts their attempt to buy beer underage at a strip mall mini mart but are attacked by Johnny. When Daniel learns that Sam is developing a relationship with Kyler, he invites Kyler over for a family dinner, where he notices that Kyler has bruises from the fight. Kyler lies about what happened to make it sound like Johnny jumped him, prompting Daniel to confront Johnny over the attack and the reformation of the Cobra Kai dojo. It turns out that Kyler is only interested in Sam for the purpose of having sex with her. He tries to make advances on her, but she dumps him after seeing him and his gang bully Miguel and his friends in the library. He subsequently attempts to grope her in a darkened movie theater, but she defends herself. In retaliation, he spreads rumors about her giving him oral sex, driving a wedge between her and Yasmine and Moon. Sam confronts him in the cafeteria when she finds out from Moon and Yasmine about the rumors, and prepares to beat him up in front of the student body. Before she can, Miguel steps in and defeats Kyler and the other members of his gang. Afterward, Kyler is hesitant to cross any of the Cobra Kais, particularly Miguel.

In season 3, Kreese recruits Kyler into Cobra Kai, much to Hawk's disapproval. Kyler passes his tryout, beating Mitch in his initiation fight by falling back on his wrestling training, and subsequently replaces Mitch's position in the dojo. However, Brucks does not follow Kyler, as Kreese rejects him after Hawk beats him within an inch of his life, an act that also intimidates Kyler. He also continues to bully students at school, most notably drawing a penis on Demetri's cast at lunch. Later in the season, Kyler is sent by Kreese with Robby, Hawk, and Tory to steal a cobra from the zoo. The mission nearly fails as Kyler, stressed out about his math grades, forgets to bring a snake pole along, but Robby manages to get the cobra while they are not looking, much to Kyler's amazement. That night, Kyler and the other Cobra Kai students attack Miyagi-Do & Eagle Fang students at the LaRussos' house. Kyler singles out Miguel for a vicious beating, seeking payback for the cafeteria fight with improved karate skills. Despite Miguel only having recently recovered from being paralyzed by Robby in the school fight, Kyler is defeated again once Miguel regains moderate abilities in his legs to kick, knocking him out with just three strikes.

In season 4, Kyler remains a part of Cobra Kai and targets Hawk for revenge as seen when he helps Robby, Tory and the other Cobra Kai students ambush Hawk and shave off Hawk's mohawk after Hawk is updating his back tattoo to match his purple mohawk. In the tournament quarter-finals, he is effortlessly defeated by Eli without winning any points after Eli regains his confidence from rekindling his relationship with Moon.

In season 5, he continues to be a part of Cobra Kai. During the fight in the dojo, Kyler mocks Eli for his loss to Kenny during the Sekai Taikai qualifier match, but is called out for continuing to be a bully. He is briefly defeated by Demetri who enjoys taking the bully down, the last of Kyler's former victims to do so. After Daniel defeats Silver in a one-on-one fight, Kyler abandons Cobra Kai along with the other students. After Silver's arrested, Kyler tries to take credit for Silver's defeat during his conversation with the cops, to no avail.

Brucks
Brucks (Bo Mitchell) is Kyler's obese and rather dimwitted best friend. He is often heard saying, "That's brute, Ky!" while Kyler harasses and assaults Miguel. After he, Kyler, and the rest of their clique are defeated by Miguel, they leave Miguel, Demetri, and Eli alone.
 
In Season 3, he is recruited into Cobra Kai alongside Kyler by Kreese, but is brutally beaten by Hawk during his tryout, and is subsequently denied a spot in Cobra Kai. Afterwards, Kyler abandons him.

Louie LaRusso Jr.
Louie LaRusso Jr. (Bret Ernst) is Daniel's cousin and a LaRusso Auto Group sales agent. He is portrayed as a childish and unprofessional man who seems to enjoy living off of his cousin's success and setting people up. Louie's antics range from allegedly running a casino in the break room at Daniel's dealership to dishonestly assigning tasks to the newly employed Robby that could get him fired, such as tricking him into starting a car in the dealership's showroom during a sales event. In retaliation for the vandalism of one of the LaRusso Auto Group's billboards by Johnny, Louie hires a group of bikers to destroy Johnny's car in Daniel's name, but the bikers are beaten up by Johnny, who finds out from Louie where Daniel lives and takes one of the motorcycles to confront Daniel over the incident. Louie is subsequently fired for his actions by Daniel.

In Season 3, with the dealership struggling in light of the school brawl, Daniel is forced to rehire Louie. Louie has cleaned up his act and become more responsible and professional as seen when Daniel mentions Louie was the first person to visit Sam in the hospital following the aftermath of her fight with Tory at school, although he is still prone to slipping into his oafish antics. He reveals to Daniel and Amanda that Robby stole a minivan after the school rumble using the dealership's inventory database. In Season 4, when Daniel and Amanda ask Louie about getting help for Anthony's misbehavior against a new Cobra Kai student named Kenny Payne, he consults his sister, Vanessa, a graduate student studying Child Psychology. In Season 5, Louie finds out that Vanessa and Anoush are dating, much to his chagrin.

Anoush Norouzi
Anoush Norouzi (Dan Ahdoot) is a LaRusso Auto Group sales agent.

In Season 2, Anoush is transferred from the Encino branch to the North Hollywood branch. After being attacked by Johnny, who is looking for Robby, Anoush leaves LaRusso Auto Group to join Cole's on Van Nuys when he is offered a better position by Tom Cole. Daniel is unable to offer Anoush a counter offer after he stands Amanda and Anoush up at an important lunch meeting due to his focus on his Miyagi-do Karate students.

In Season 3, Anoush has come to resent working for Cole, who treats him disrespectfully and does not even bother to remember his name. Out of spite, he tells Louie about how Cole is convincing Doyona to cut their ties with LaRusso Auto Group. As a reward for his inside information and loyalty, the LaRussos rehire him to work for them.

In Season 5, it is revealed that Anoush is dating Louie's sister Vanessa, much to the latter's chagrin.

Counselor Blatt
Counselor Blatt (Erin Bradley Dangar) is the high school guidance counselor and vice-principal. She went to high school with Daniel and Ali. She is not very competent at her job, being focused on using progressive-sounding buzzwords and performative gestures while turning a blind eye to bigger issues like classism, bullying, sexism, and racism. As such, she is unable to properly read a situation, to the point that Hawk is able to manipulate her into letting him get away with bullying because he knows how to use her vocabulary to play the victim card well enough while she punishes other students for swearing.

Yasmine
Yasmine (Annalisa Cochrane) is the leader of a clique of popular girls at West Valley High. She takes pleasure in cyberbullying Aisha and looking down at less privileged students. One night, while driving with Moon and Sam, she accidentally collides with Johnny's parked car (outside the All Valley Sports Arena) when she is distracted while texting behind the wheel. The girls flee the scene after a drunk Johnny scares them off. Later, Yasmine kicks Sam out of her clique after Kyler begins spreading rumors about her as retaliation for her fending off his attempt to date-rape her.

Later in the season, Yasmine plans a birthday party at the beach, but Cobra Kai ruins her plans by hosting a party there first. While Kyler tries to suggest that they relocate their party to another location, Yasmine tries to intimidate Aisha, who retaliates by giving her a front wedgie, humiliating her and driving her to flee.

Yasmine is not seen in Season 2, but it is mentioned by Moon that she is in France for the summer. Aisha, still harboring resentment and anger toward Yasmine, angrily states to Moon, "Tell her she can stay in France".

Yasmine returns in Season 3 and though she remains antagonistic, she has lost her popular status and her clique dismantled due to the wedgie incident, but has repaired her friendships with Moon and Sam. She develops a crush on Demetri, and is dismayed when Hawk "accidentally" ruins Demetri's science project at lunch. She later takes pity on Demetri after Kyler vandalizes his cast and humiliates him, writing an innuendo-laden compliment over Kyler's doodle of a long penis, and also admits she can relate to Demetri on how being a laughingstock feels. Late in the season, she and Demetri enter into a relationship, with Sam and Miguel catching them making out in the hallway at one point.

In Season 4, Yasmine has developed a deep affection for Demetri, and isn't afraid to be open to kissing him in public. She later goes to prom as his partner after finishing a vacation early to surprise him.

In Season 5, Yasmine continues her relationship with Demetri, while advising Sam about her relationship with Miguel and trying to help with her identity crisis.

Moon
Moon (Hannah Kepple) is a member of Yasmine's popular girl clique. She has a new-age hippie fashion sense and a pacifistic personality, abhorring all forms of violence. When the Cobra Kai students hold a party at the canyon park to prevent Yasmine from hosting her planned birthday party there, Moon apologizes to Aisha for her previous behavior and is then banished from Yasmine's clique right before a vengeful Aisha gives Yasmine a front wedgie in retaliation for her cyber-bullying. At the All Valley tournament, Moon sits with Demetri and cheers for Hawk.

At the end of Season 1 and in the beginning of Season 2, Moon enters into a relationship with Hawk, but breaks up with him after she leans about Hawk attacking Demetri at the mall over a negative review on Cobra Kai he posted on Yelp. Later in the season, with tensions rising between Miyagi-Do and Cobra Kai, Moon tries to get members of the two dojos to reconcile by throwing a party at her house, which backfires horribly. It is at this party that Hawk learns Moon has moved on and now has a girlfriend named Piper Elswith.

In Season 3, after the school rumble, Moon and several other students take a neutral stance and partake in peaceful protests for the Cobra Kai and Miyagi-Do students to become friends. Moon also pitches in when Sam starts a car wash fundraiser to help pay for Miguel's surgery. During a soccer game, Hawk winks at Moon, who ignores it and flirts with a different boy instead. Demetri, under Sam's orders for Miyagi-Do to foul the Cobra Kais, also taunts Hawk about his relationship woes and losing Moon before tripping him.

In Season 4, Moon breaks up with Piper and she eventually makes up with the remorseful Hawk. During the tournament, when Eli expresses doubt in himself, Moon reassures him that she'll root for him and they rekindle their relationship, restoring his confidence. This allows Eli to beat Kyler in just a matter of seconds.

In Season 5, Moon continues her relationship with Eli, while advising Sam about her relationship with Miguel and trying to help with her identity crisis.

Nestor
Nestor (Vas Sanchez) runs Reseda Flats Mini Mart at the strip mall. He displays no regard for hygiene by handing Johnny a slice of pizza with his bare hand and without a paper plate. He is seen in later episodes, one time approving a sale of beer to Hawk as he fails to detect Hawk's "Walter Hawkman" fake ID; another time remarking to Johnny he may have to close up shop as their landlord doubled their rent. He also gets insulted by Kreese when they both buy beer at his mini-mart before Daniel confronts the two.

Lynn
Lynn (Susan Gallagher) (colloquially known as Homeless Lynn among fans and the media) is a homeless woman who hangs around the strip mall. Johnny hires her to hold a sign to let passers-by know about the Cobra Kai dojo. She is also seen harassing Moon and Yasmine for money at the parking lot.

In Season 3, Johnny encounters Lynn at a soup kitchen where Robby is doing community service. She is also seen hanging out in front of the Cobra Kai dojo in Season 4.

Tom Cole
Tom Cole (David Shatraw) is the owner of Cole's Autos on Van Nuys, a rival automotive dealership. Daniel confronts him over his latest commercial that copies LaRusso Auto Group's concept. When Tom insults Daniel over his billboard that Johnny vandalized, Daniel responds by kicking boba tea out of his hand.

Cole is not seen in season 2, but it is mentioned that a lot of Daniel's employees have left the LaRusso dealership for Cole, including Anoush, due to Daniel neglecting his dealerships in his efforts to keep Miyagi-Do afloat, and standing Amanda and Anoush up at an important lunch meeting.

In Season 3, with LaRusso Auto's reputation damaged by Robby's affiliation with Miyagi-Do and actions against Miguel during the school fight, Cole approaches the LaRussos with the intent of buying out their Van Nuys location after convincing Doyona to void their contract with the LaRussos. However, his efforts are undone when Anoush, bitter over being disrespected by Cole, "lets slip" to Louie his boss's plans, and is rewarded by getting his old posting at LaRusso Auto.

Rhonda
Rhonda (Carole Kaboya) is Sid's caregiver, who is a target of Sid's verbal abuse. She is seen as being a fan of Judge Judy.

Armand Zarkarian
Armand Zarkarian (Ken Davitian) is an Armenian-American real estate tycoon. Armand and Daniel are the only members of the Encino Oaks Country Club who come from a lower-class background and earned their own money instead of inheriting it.

Facing stiff competition from Tom Cole, Daniel asks Armand to find him property in Reseda for a new dealership location; in exchange, he will have the Encino Oaks Country Club reinstate Armand's membership (which Armand lost when he got blacklisted for urinating in the country club's shower room). Armand initially offers the strip mall but backs out when he suspects Daniel has an ulterior motive for the location. Instead, he doubles the rent of the strip mall's tenants, which is actually part of Daniel's elaborate scheme to shut down Cobra Kai in retaliation for Johnny vandalizing the LaRusso Auto Group billboard.

In Season 2, Armand threatens to increase Johnny's rent when the Cobra Kai dojo receives more students. He also imposes a fee on the storage room behind the dojo, even though it was part of the lease Johnny signed. In the end, Armand backs down his demands to Johnny following a handshake deal. By the end of the season, however, it is revealed that Armand had made a secret deal with Kreese to take the dojo away from Johnny when Johnny was visiting his dying friend Tommy after Miguel is accidentally crippled by Robby at the end the school brawl.

In Season 3, Armand agrees to a deal with Amanda to evict Kreese out of the strip mall, despite Kreese consistently paying his rent on time. He reluctantly calls off the deal, however, when Kreese beats him and his nephews up and subsequently browbeats them into admitting to being hired by the LaRussos.

Rolan Zarkarian
Rolan Zarkarian (Alex Huff) is Armand's son. He and Anthony bicker over who has the more powerful father.

Cruz and Trey
Cruz (Jeff Kaplan) and Trey (Terayle Hill) are Robby's former friends who spend their time committing petty theft. Earlier in the series, Cruz sports a mustache, but he shaves it off after being mocked by Johnny. Upon learning that Robby landed a job at LaRusso Auto Group, they ask him to obtain the PIN of the dealership's garage so they can steal some car parts. When Robby refuses to give them the passcode and turns against them, Cruz and Trey attempt to attack him but Robby fights them off with his new karate skills. Eventually, they corner him, but quickly run away upon discovering that their activities have been recorded on a security camera and vow revenge.

In Season 2, Robby once again confronts Cruz and Trey at the Oaks on the Beach Country Club when he catches them stealing wallets, but he is knocked out by a new third member of their gang named Derek. Daniel steps in to incapacitate the gang and save Robby. Robby has the whole confrontation recorded on his phone, but Daniel asks him not to use the footage to promote Miyagi-Do Karate, reminding him that karate is only for defense and protection.

By the start of Season 3, Cruz and Trey have been arrested and sent to jail. Johnny and Daniel visit them and force them to reveal information on Robby's possible whereabouts. When Trey and Cruz refuse to cooperate and make fun of Johnny for his injuries during the parking lot fight, Johnny slaps Cruz twice and leaves him with a bloody nose before Trey tells them to check out Tech Town for more clues on Robby's whereabouts as they used to scam customers at Tech Town when they were friends with Robby. As Daniel and Johnny leave to find Robby, Cruz complains that he is bleeding and Trey asks Cruz if he is crying.

Daryl
Daryl (Keith Arthur Bolden) is an African-American member of the All Valley Committee and the announcer for the 2018 and 2019 All Valley Under-18 Karate Championships. He suggests changing the tournament's colors from red and white to blue and gold to improve the tournament's declining attendance numbers. Daryl also admires Cobra Kai for being "a badass name for a dojo". He is not to be confused with Darryl Vidal.

Ron
Ron (Matt Lewis) is the president of the All Valley Committee. Despite Daniel's vehement objections to lifting the lifetime ban on Cobra Kai from competing at the All Valley Tournament, Ron opts to let Johnny make his case and put the matter to a vote. He, Daryl, and Sue ultimately outvote Daniel and George to lift the ban. In Season 3, when the All Valley Tournament is in jeopardy of being canceled in light of the school rumble, Ron makes a personal visit to Daniel at the Miyagi-Do dojo to convince him to use his status as a two-time karate champion to fight the cancellation. In Season 4, he invites pop star Carrie Underwood as a guest performer for the All-Valley tournament before the qualifying matches.

Sue
Sue (Cara AnnMarie) is the only female member of the All Valley Committee. She admonishes Daniel for his insensitivity when Johnny is under the notion Kreese is deceased. After listening to Johnny admit that Cobra Kai indeed had past sins and explains what he hopes to accomplish, states that their community could use more men like him, which Johnny greatly appreciates.

George
George (Kurt Yue) is an Asian-American member of the All Valley Committee. He is a close friend of Daniel and supports his vote on keeping Cobra Kai banned from competing in the All Valley Under-18 Karate Championships, but they are outvoted by Daryl, Ron, and Sue.

Xander Stone
Xander Stone (Talin Chat) represents Topanga Karate and is the 2017 All Valley Under-18 Karate Champion. He is eliminated in the semifinals by Miguel but takes his loss like a gentleman, bowing to his opponent. He is an upstanding citizen, having voiced his dislike of all hatred. He has a loud and aggressive mother. In Season 4, he appears with video footage of his fight with Aisha, causing the All Valley committee to decide to create a separate girls division to mitigate bad publicity, but is not shown fighting for Topanga, presumably because he has already turned 18, therefore ineligible to compete in the under 18 All Valley Karate Tournament.

Patricia Stone
Patricia Stone (Suehyla El-Attar) is Xander's mother. She sits next to Amanda during the All-Valley Under-18 Karate Championships and is mostly supporting her son during the fighting rounds, especially when he defeats Aisha Robinson and also when he faces Miguel Diaz.

Mrs. Jenkins
Mrs. Jenkins (Linda Boston) is the Vice-Principal of North Hills High School. She often contacts Shannon about Robby's disciplinary issues, such as constant truancy. However, when Shannon is nowhere to be found, Mrs. Jenkins contacts Johnny instead, informing him his son was caught with an illegal drug. Johnny chastises Robby over the phone for this behavior, warning him he will be throwing his life away, to which Robby retorts in that case "he will turn into his father".

Mr. Palmer
Mr. Palmer is a Science teacher at West Valley High School. In season 1, he is the teacher of a biology class where Miguel and Demetri take Sam in during a fetal pig dissection lab. In season 2, Demetri tries to get him to help break up the school brawl, but refuses after another teacher gets flipped, commenting "they don't pay [him] enough". After Mr. Palmer refuses to help Demetri break up the school fight, Demetri is reluctantly forced to take on Hawk.

Judy
Judy (Kylie Delre) is a rich woman who gets into a heated argument with Johnny in episode 1 after he mounts her TV on the wrong wall in her house. During the argument, he tells her to "stop bitching" at him, which she misinterprets as him calling her a bitch; this incident gets him fired from his old job as a handyman. Judy makes a return in Season 2 as one of Johnny's Tinder dates. Remembering the last time they met, she storms out of the restaurant, swearing off dating apps.

Abe
Abe (Jayden Rivers) was a Cobra Kai student who later defected to Miyagi-Do Karate.  Abe joins Cobra Kai Dojo along with many others after Miguel's self-defense demonstration in the school cafeteria. He soon begins learning the "Way of the Fist" just as Miguel and Aisha Robinson had. He is shown at the All-Valley Tournament cheering for Cobra Kai classmate Aisha when she defeats her opponent and later celebrating with the rest of his classmates when Miguel wins the tournament, but Abe isn't shown competing.

In season 2, he quits Cobra Kai along with fellow students Chris, Frank, Lil Red and Nathaniel due to Kreese's vicious teachings. He then joins Miyagi-Do, but Robby Keene is against them joining due to Chris attacking Demetri at the mall, and Robby thinking that the former Cobra Kai students vandalized the Dojo. Daniel lets them join and they all settle in with the Miyagi teachings. He is seen at Moon's party with Lil Red cheering Nathaniel, who is in a dance battle with Edwin. After Demetri roasts Hawk at the party, he is seen with the rest of the Miyagi-dos ready to fight the Cobra Kais right before the police showed up. Not long afterwards, Abe participates in the school brawl against Edwin, evenly matched until Edwin eventually overpowers him. He stops participating at the brawl at some point, and is later seen cheering the rest of the Miyagi-Dos in the school fight along with Frank. He is among those who witness Miguel's fall.

In season 3, Abe appears again at the car wash fundraiser for Miguel's surgery run and managed by Samantha LaRusso and Moon and the Miyagi-Dos who started it. He is a carwash participant and the group raises $2500. Samantha reminds him of 'Wax on, Wax off' and also corrects the way he is washing the car and he nods, agreeing on what to do. At the end of the day, he and Frank are exchanging cash from what they worked on from the car wash with Nathaniel and are fist bumping together. He is then seen outside of the Larusso's door with Miyagi-Do telling Sam that Cobra Kai beat Nathaniel up and took the money away from him. Next scene he is at the lunch room, with Frank and Lil Red, trying to find a table. However, when they witness Kyler bullying Demetri by drawing a penis on his cast, they feel bad for Demetri. In the last scene of the season finale, he is shown at Miyagi Do with the Miyagi Do and Eagle Fang Karate Students, as well as former Cobra Kai student Hawk, preparing to train for the next All Valley Tournament.

Frank
Frank (Cameron Markeles) was a Cobra Kai student who later defected to Miyagi-Do Karate. Frank joins Cobra Kai Dojo along with many others after Miguel's self-defense demonstration in the school cafeteria. He soon begins learning the "Way of the Fist" just as Miguel and Aisha Robinson had. He is shown at the All-Valley Tournament cheering for Cobra Kai classmate Aisha when she defeats her opponent and later celebrating with the rest of his classmates when Miguel wins the tournament, but Frank isn't shown competing.

In season 2, he quits Cobra Kai along with fellow students Chris, Abe, Lil Red and Nathaniel due to Kreese's vicious teachings. He then joins Miyagi-Do, but Robby Keene is against them joining due to Chris attacking Demetri at the mall, and Robby thinking that the former Cobra Kai students vandalized the Dojo. Daniel lets them join and they all settle in with the Miyagi teachings. He is seen at Moon's party with Lil Red cheering Nathaniel, who is in a dance battle with Edwin. After Demetri roasts Hawk at the party, he is seen with the rest of the Miyagi-dos ready to fight the Cobra Kais right before the police showed up. During the school fight, He seen cheering the rest of the Miyagi-Dos in the school fight along with Abe. He is among those who witness Miguel's fall.

In season 3, Frank appears again at the car wash fundraiser for Miguel's surgery run and managed by Samantha LaRusso and Moon and the Miyagi-Dos who started it. He is a carwash participant and at the end of the day, he and Abe are exchanging cash from what they worked on from the car wash with Nathaniel and are fist bumping together.

He is then seen outside of the Larusso's door with Miyagi-Do telling Sam that Cobra Kai beat Nathaniel up and took the money away from him. Next scene he is at the lunch room, with Abe and Lil Red, trying to find a table. However, when they witness Kyler bullying Demetri by drawing a penis on his cast, they feel bad for Demetri. In the last scene of the season finale, he is shown at Miyagi Do with the Miyagi Do and Eagle Fang Karate Students, as well as former Cobra Kai student Hawk, preparing to train for the next All Valley Tournament.

Cobra Kai: Season 2 (2019) introductions
Actors from The Karate Kid, Rob Garrison (Tommy), Ron Thomas (Bobby Brown), Tony O'Dell (Jimmy), and Randee Heller (Lucille LaRusso) made guest appearances during this season.

Tory Nichols

Tory Nichols (Peyton List) is an athlete from a poor family. When Tory was a child, her mother worked at a restaurant and would bring home leftovers so that Tory and her younger brother had enough to eat. When the restaurant manager found out, he fired Tory's mother without warning because it was against company policy to take leftovers home (even though, Tory states, it wasn't stealing because the food was already paid for and would go to waste). This experience shaped Tory's philosophy that the world shows no mercy and that people have to fight in a destructive way for what they want.

When she arrives at the Cobra Kai dojo, she impresses both Johnny and Kreese with her kickboxing abilities. She becomes friends with Aisha and starts a relationship with Miguel but develops a heated rivalry with Sam after an incident at the beach club where Sam accuses Tory of stealing her mother's wallet, though this accusation was based on an earlier comment--possibly meant as a joke--made by Tory about stealing or doing something similar. Her animosity toward Sam is further deepened when she finds out that Sam is Miguel's ex-girlfriend and catches Sam kissing Miguel while Tory was still dating him, leading her to strike out at Sam any time she sees them together. A vengeful Tory decides to furiously challenge Sam to a fight in school. Amidst the confusion, the students of the two dojos fight each other in an all-out brawl that ends with Robby accidentally kicking Miguel over a balcony railing and sending him falling off the second floor. She eventually sides with Kreese following the coup at Cobra Kai after Miguel is crippled by Robby at the end of the school fight.

In Season 3, Tory is expelled from school for instigating the school brawl, placed on unsupervised probation, and is forced to take on a day job waitressing at a sushi restaurant to make ends meet for her struggling family as her mother is undergoing dialysis, and is constantly harassed by her perverted landlord Rodney, who makes sexual advances at her, and uses the threat of reporting her to her probation officer to prevent her from retaliating and intimidate her into backing off. Kreese approaches Tory, needing her back at the dojo, and secures her loyalty by threatening her landlord. As Kreese's star student, Tory stops at nothing to exact her revenge on Sam, causing her to break up with Miguel after he disagrees with her desire to seek revenge against Sam and the rest of Miyagi-Do. Later in the season, Tory befriends Robby after he joins Cobra Kai when they find common ground in their broken home lives and their own betrayals from Miguel, Johnny, and Sam as well as their resentment toward their probation and expulsion from school for their roles in the school brawl. Upon finding out that Sam has gotten back together with Miguel and helped him save the All-Valley Tournament from being canceled due to the aftermath of the school brawl, Tory leads the Cobra Kais in an attack on the LaRusso household, engaging the students of Miyagi-Do and Johnny's new dojo, Eagle Fang Karate. She singles out Sam, chasing her into the Miyagi-Do dojo and attacking her with nunchucks. When Tory breaks a portrait of Mr. Miyagi, however, Sam regains her resolve and fights back with a bo staff, disarming Tory. She attempts to escalate the situation, only to be cornered by Hawk, Demetri, and Miguel in the process. Tory retreats, but not before furiously vowing revenge on Hawk, Miguel, and Sam. In response to Tory threatening Hawk, Demetri retorts that Hawk's friends will always have his back.

In Season 4, Tory starts a relationship with Robby and is befriended by Amanda LaRusso, Sam's mother, who helps Tory find another job and with her mother after Tory gets fired from her waitress job at the sushi restaurant for losing her temper and lashing out at a customer. She later turns to Amanda for help with her home situation after being confronted by her aunt Kandace and is later able to return to school after Amanda gives her permission, revealing that she has come to empathize with Tory, as Amanda understands the feeling of letting one's emotions guide their actions. Sam later reluctantly agrees as well to satisfy her parents, but she remains suspicious of Tory's motivations. During the finals, she faces off against Sam again, but Amanda asks Tory to fight within the rules and expresses hope that the match will finally end the rivalry between the two girls. With Sam combining Miyagi-Do and Eagle Fang techniques, she proves to be a match for Tory who accidentally elbows her in the eye. Despite Terry Silver encouraging Tory to illegally hit Sam in the other eye to win, Tory, recalling their previous fights, fights clean and wins. Much to Sam's surprise, Tory expresses genuine concern for Sam's injuries once the fight is over, showing that she has agreed to honor Amanda's request to end her rivalry with Sam once and for all. Tory's win gives Cobra Kai the All-Valley championship, but Tory is devastated and conflicted when she catches Silver bribing the referee for rigging the final match between her and Sam in Cobra Kai's favor which is why he hadn't deducted a point from Tory after her hit to Sam's eye and had earlier refused to give Sam a point saying Tory was out of bounds even though she stepped out of bounds after Sam scored.

In Season 5, Tory remains in Cobra Kai and breaks up with Robby. Despite this, she is left conflicted by Silver's cheating and is working with Kreese, who is behind bars, to undermine him. During her time in Silver's Cobra Kai, she develops animosity with ruthless new sensei Kim Da-eun, who physically torments Tory, at one point making her punch a stone dummy for abandoning her match during the Sekai Taikai tryouts. After the tryouts, Tory defects from Cobra Kai and makes amends with Sam. Tory eventually helps the Miyagi-Fang students to expose Silver, coming up with the idea of breaking into the flagship Cobra Kai dojo and hacking into Cobra Kai's server to get the security footage of Silver attacking Stingray. When the video is found to be erased, Tory suggests stealing the security footage of Silver confessing to her that he had bribed the referee. During the fight that follows, Tory falls into trouble with Kim, but both Sam and Devon leap to her defense, Devon defecting when she sees that Tory is in trouble. After Anthony LaRusso posts the footage to the Internet and shows it Cobra Kai, Silver is exposed and ultimately arrested with Stingray also revealing the truth about Silver's attack on him. In the aftermath, Tory makes amends with Robby and they kiss.

Raymond "Stingray" Porter
Raymond "Stingray" Porter (Paul Walter Hauser) is a hardware store employee. An immature and irresponsible man-child, he is pathologically adverse to adulthood and the responsibilities that come with it, suggesting he may have Peter Pan Syndrome. One day, he bonds with Johnny after seeing him wearing a Metallica shirt, commenting that he is also a fan of 1980s heavy metal music before selling him a replacement mirror for the Cobra Kai dojo. After watching a Cobra Kai demonstration at the Valley Fest, Raymond enrolls in the dojo to become the oldest student on the roster. Initially known as "Chubbs" by Johnny, he "flips the script" on his own lifestyle by braiding his beard and calling himself Stingray. After the summer break, Stingray attempts to get a job as a security guard at West Valley High and was in his interview meeting when the student rumble breaks out. Stingray wades into the battle demonstrating karate moves and blatantly only targeting the Miyagi-Do students, while congratulating Hawk with a high-five. Stingray initially sides with Kreese after his takeover of Cobra Kai, but is forced out after he is arrested and put under probation in Season 3 for his role in the high school brawl.

In Season 4, Stingray has been shown to live in his sister's home. When Stingray's probation is finished, he eagerly attempts to rejoin Cobra Kai, but is vehemently rejected by Kreese. He later hosts West Valley High's junior prom after-party. Not long after, Stingray re-enters the Cobra Kai dojo and asks Terry Silver to be on the team once more. In response, a drunken Silver brutally beats him and sustains injuries that leave him hospitalized. After waking up in the hospital, he claims that Kreese was his assailant to a detective. It is revealed that Silver had promised Stingray he would be able to rejoin Cobra Kai by coercing him into framing Kreese for the near-fatal assault.

In Season 5, Stingray is granted membership into Cobra Kai and has his apartment paid for by Terry Silver for lying at Kreese's trial. When Daniel is tipped off by Tory about this, he and Chozen visit Stingray in his apartment to interrogate him, but he refuses to answer, resulting in Daniel verbally berating him until Chozen intervenes. Later, Bert leads the Miyagi-Fang students into his home in hopes of gaining evidence to expose Silver's true colors. Using a fictional Dungeons and Dragons story, he admits that Silver indeed assaulted him but is afraid to confess out of fear of retaliation. However, he later begins to have doubts about his actions, leading him to rescue Daniel who is stranded in a rural area and takes him to the Cobra Kai dojo to save the kids, easily defeating four Cobra Kai members guarding the door. After Silver's defeat, Stingray reveals the truth about the attack to the police leaving Silver with a litany of criminal charges.

Mitch
Mitch (Aedin Mincks) is a student who joins Cobra Kai with Chris in season 2. He is nicknamed "Ass Face" and "Penis Breath" by Hawk and Johnny, respectively, which he sees as a term of endearment rather than a pejorative insult. During his training, he becomes one of Hawk's lackeys. Mitch eventually turns against Johnny and sides with Kreese after Kreese takes control of the dojo when Miguel is accidentally crippled by Robby at the end of the school brawl.

During the course of Season 3, Mitch joins Hawk in beating up Nathaniel in order to steal money for Miguel's fundraiser from Miyagi-Do in retaliation for Robby's actions against Miguel during the school brawl. Despite Mitch's loyalty to the dojo, Kreese expels him and eventually replaces him with Kyler after he loses a sparring match to Kyler during the tryouts to recruit new members. After being expelled from Cobra Kai, Mitch becomes an outcast among Hawk and his former Cobra Kai classmates and is rejected and shunned as seen when Hawk mockingly tells Mitch to go sit with Bert and the other outcasts who were expelled from Cobra Kai during lunch but is subsequently recruited by Miguel to Johnny's new dojo, Eagle Fang Karate, and is eventually reunited with Chris after Miguel works out an alliance with Sam and Demetri between Eagle Fang and Miyagi-Do as well as Hawk after he redeems himself during the LaRusso house fight.

In season 4, he remains a member of Eagle Fang.

In season 5, he remains a member of Eagle Fang, but at the end of the season, Mitch betrays the Miyagi-Do and Eagle Fang students plan by tipping them off to Kenny and the other Cobra Kai students, revealing that he had rejoined Silver's Cobra Kai. He ends up defecting again when Silver is exposed by the students.

Chris
Chris (Khalil Everage) is a student who initially who joins Cobra Kai with his best friend Mitch. Both of them become lackeys of Hawk, but Chris becomes troubled by his thuggish antics. When Daniel confronts Johnny and Kreese over the vandalism of the Miyagi-do Karate dojo, Chris joins several students in defecting to Daniel's dojo, showing himself a scrupulous person causing a rift between him and Mitch throughout the season. Demetri initially does not get along with Chris due to the latter's past involvement in Hawk's gang, but with encouragement from Daniel after he explains that he was a Cobra Kai member (from The Karate Kid Part III), they both reconcile with each other and learn to work together to lift a rock back up.

In Season 3, Chris is openly harassed by Cobra Kai at his job, prompting him to call Sam for reinforcements. After Mitch's removal from Cobra Kai, the pair reconcile and train under Eagle Fang Karate. In Season 4, Chris is unhappy with Hawk being accepted into Miyagi Do until he helps them build an Okinawan sparring deck. When Miyagi Do and Eagle Fang split, he stays in Miyagi Do, but is more accepting of Hawk. In the tournament, he makes it to Round 16, but is defeated by Kyler. After Eli wins the boys' finals, Chris is the first to embrace him. In Season 5, Chris continues to train in Miyagi-Do.

Nathaniel
Nathaniel (Nathaniel Oh) is a diminutive junior student of Cobra Kai. He joins Chris and several other students to jump ship to Miyagi-do Karate after Daniel furiously confronts Johnny about the Miyagi-Do dojo being vandalized by Hawk and his gang. During the student rumble at the end of Season 2, Nathaniel fights Bert until both boys are taken away from the hallway by one of the security guards.

In Season 3, Nate is tasked to take the money collected from Miyagi-Do's fundraising car wash and deliver it to pay for Miguel's surgery, but Hawk's gang attacks him and takes credit for the payment. Bert reconciles with Nate after being kicked out of Cobra Kai by Kreese. During the rivalry on December 19, Nate and Bert were fighting Doug Rickenberger. Nate was seen fighting in the background. When Demetri punches Doug in the face, he grabs Nate and smooshes his face against the glass. After the rivalry, Nate and Bert become friends.

In Season 4, Nate is now best friends with Bert and they bully Kenny Payne while on a tour of the high school. When the two dojos split, Nate remains with Miyagi-Do. He later loses to Kenny in the qualifying rounds of the tournament.

In Season 5, Nate continues to train with Miyagi-Do.

Doug Rickenberger
Doug Rickenberger (John Cihangir) is one of the Cobra Kai students, a cheater and a member of Hawk's gang in Season 2, and serves as a supporting antagonist in Cobra Kai season 3. By Season 4, he later quits Cobra Kai, as it is said by Kyler that "half the squad quit".

Sunny Mitchell
Sunny Mitchell (Kathleen Hogan) is the host of the annual Valley Fest.

Sandra Robinson
Sandra Robinson (Kim Fields) is Aisha's mother. At the Oaks on the Beach Country Club, she boasts about how Cobra Kai changed her daughter's life for the better.

Mrs. Moskowitz
Mrs. Moskowitz (Caroline Avery Granger) is seen in a flashback where she urges West Valley High over the phone to do something about the cyberbullying inflicted on her son, Eli about his facial deformity. She is then told that the school will make an announcement, much to Eli's dismay.

Big Red
Big Red (Christopher Ryan Lewis) is a Cobra Kai student and Lil Red's older brother. He is affiliated with Cobra Kai under John Kreese.

Lil Red
Lil Red (Shane Donovan Lewis) is a Cobra Kai student who then joins Miyagi-Do and Big Red's younger brother.

Mikey Miller
Mikey Miller (Chris Schmidt Jr.) is one of the Cobra Kai students and the second-in-command of Hawk's gang and a supporting antagonist in the second and third season. He later quits Cobra Kai, as it is said by Kyler that "half the squad quit".

Graham
Graham (Alex Collins) is a British man who dates Carmen. When Johnny overhears Graham saying that he plans on dumping Carmen after "a few bangs", Johnny attacks him outside the bar. After being told to never go near Carmen again, Graham promises to ghost her before Johnny walks away.

Piper Elswith
Piper Elswith (Selah Austria) is Moon's ex-girlfriend. She attends the end-of-summer party hosted by Moon. She and Moon started dating after the latter broke up with Hawk when she found out about him bullying Demetri, over his Yelp review on the Cobra Kai dojo. In Season 4, Piper and Moon break up for unknown reasons. Later when Eagle Fang Karate attempts to find new female students for the All-Valley Tournament, she instead joins Cobra Kai along with her teammates when she is given new gear ordered by Terry Silver. In the tournament quarterfinals, she shows arrogance toward Sam after scoring a point, inspiring Sam to use her Eagle Fang training instead. This throws Piper off guard, resulting in her being easily defeated.

Melissa
Melissa (Gena Shaw) is a woman who hits on Johnny at the bar while he is in the middle of messaging Ali on Facebook. Johnny ultimately decides against it, but Melissa's accidental bump into him causes him to inadvertently send the message. She flirts with Johnny the same way he described to Miguel as the way to hit on a girl back in his day. She and Johnny spend time drinking together and have a lot in common. Their night ends abruptly when Johnny sees an opportunity to confront Graham while he is urinating outside due to the men's room being out of order. Melissa is disappointed when Johnny doesn't ask for her number before he leaves thereafter.

Cutter
Cutter (Stephan Jones) is a construction worker who loans Johnny his cement mixer truck for the Cobra Kai students to manually rotate the drum as part of their strength training.

Cobra Kai: Season 3 (2021) introductions
Actors from The Karate Kid and The Karate Kid II, Elisabeth Shue (Ali Mills), Ron Thomas (Bobby Brown), Tamlyn Tomita (Kumiko), Traci Toguchi (Yuna), and Yuji Okumoto (Chozen Toguchi) all made guest appearances during this season.

Shawn Payne
Shawn Payne (Okea Eme-Akwari) is a juvenile detainee at Sylmar Juvenile Corrections. In season 3, he eventually sets his sights on Robby after he defends an inmate being bullied, later mocking his relationship problems with Sam and Johnny, taking his pillow, vandalizing his property and unplugging a computer as well as beating up Robby only with the help of two other guys. After security splits up a second fight between the two which Robby wins instead, he and Robby show mutual respect towards each other for not snitching on each other. In season 4, his younger brother Kenny Payne visits Shawn for advice after he is harassed and cyberbullied at school by Daniel's son Anthony and his friends. Shawn assures him not to worry and suggests that he look for Robby at the Cobra Kai dojo for assistance. Kenny later tells Robby that Shawn is sentenced to spend an extra month at juvenile hall for spitting at a guard. He also reveals that Shawn was detained after assaulting a former friend who stole from their parents and attempted to attack him at home, while defending Kenny. Robby indirectly mentions Shawn unplugging his computer by jokingly asking Kenny if Shawn spit at a computer lab guard. Later at the 2019 All-Valley Tournament, Robby tells Kenny that Shawn would be proud of him for his improved progress under his mentorship.

Rodney
Rodney (Grayson Berry) is Tory's apartment complex landlord. He constantly harasses Tory for rent, even going so far as making sexual advances towards her at one point, until Kreese forces him to quit the harassment by threatening to cut his finger off with a cigar cutter.

David
David (Jesse Kove) is a college varsity captain in 1965. When he is given a flyer to join the U.S. Army during the Vietnam War, David crumples it and throws it to the diner floor; Kreese picks it up and decides to enlist. David and his friends bully John Kreese throughout high school until Kreese sees him slap Betsy. In retaliation, Kreese beats up David and his gang and wins Betsy's heart.

Betsy
Betsy (Emily Marie Palmer) is Kreese's girlfriend from his youth. Originally David's girlfriend, she leaves him after Kreese beats David and his friends down at the back of the diner for hitting her. Afterwards, Kreese and her started dating up until Kreese enlisted in the U.S. Army. During Kreese's tour of duty in Vietnam, it is revealed in a letter that Betsy is killed in a car accident in Pasadena while visiting her grandmother. Captain Turner does not notify Kreese of Betsy's death until both men are forced by their Vietcong captors to a deathmatch above a snake pit. Her death causes Kreese to become devastated and ultimately helps to shape Kreese into the man he is today.

Captain Turner
Captain George Turner (Terry Serpico) was Kreese's commanding officer during the Vietnam War. Having learned Tang Soo Do during the Korean War from Kim Sun-yung, he teaches his team his style of self-defense, which would eventually be the foundation of Cobra Kai karate and treats his fellow soldiers with cruelty and ruthlessness. In 1969, Turner and his team are given a covert operation to sneak into and destroy a Vietcong compound, but they are captured after Ponytail fails to leave the target area and Kreese hesitates to detonate the bomb placed by Ponytail, since detonating it would kill the latter. Just before engaging in a deathmatch above a snake pit, Turner reveals Betsy's death to Kreese to demoralize him so that Turner can save himself. During their fight, U.S. Air Force planes bomb the compound, causing the Vietcong to flee the area as Turner hangs on the bridge for his life. He begs Kreese to help him up, but Kreese forces him to fall to his death. Kreese's experiences with Turner would lead to him becoming the ruthless and merciless man he is in the present day.

Ponytail
Ponytail (Seth Kemp) is one of John Kreese's old Vietnam buddies. Alongside Kreese and Terry Silver, Ponytail joins Captain Turner's group. After the group is captured in their failed operation, Ponytail is shot dead by the Vietcong. After returning from the war, Silver sports a ponytail as a tribute to him.

Councilperson Roberts
Councilperson Roberts (Zele Avradopoulos) is the city councilmember who wanted to ban the All-Valley Under 18 Tournament due to the aftermath of the school brawl. Eventually, after being unanimously outvoted thanks to Miguel and Samantha's speech about why the dojos need to compete in the All-Valley Tournament, she relented, given that the students must sign a waiver.

Dee Snider
Dee Snider (himself) is a heavy metal singer-songwriter best known as the lead vocalist of the band Twisted Sister. At a Snider concert, Johnny manages to let Miguel through security, telling them that Miguel has terminal cancer. During the show, Snider acknowledges the presence of Miguel under the false pretense that he was sent by the Make-A-Wish Foundation.

Cobra Kai: Season 4 (2021) introductions
Thomas Ian Griffith reprised his role as Terry Silver from The Karate Kid III, and actors from The Karate Kid and The Karate Kid II, Yuji Okumoto (Chozen Toguchi) and Randee Heller (Lucille LaRusso), made guest appearances.

 Kenny Payne 
Kenny Payne (Dallas Dupree Young) is the youngest son of a U.S. Army soldier stationed in Qatar, and the younger brother of Shawn Payne. He enrolls as a new student at West Valley Middle School, where he is a target of bullying by Daniel's son Anthony LaRusso and his friends. After being catfished and cyberbullied by the gang, Kenny visits Shawn in juvenile hall and claims that Anthony knows karate. Shawn suggests that Kenny look for Johnny's son Robby Keene, a former inmate whom he once fought, for help. Kenny, despite his timid nature, arrives at Cobra Kai due to Shawn's recommendation. After he is rejected by Kreese, Robby visits Kenny at his house, returning his backpack and trains Kenny on his own time after learning of his bullying, with the duo developing a mentor-mentee relationship. Kenny later tells Robby that Shawn is sentenced to an extra month in juvenile hall for spitting in a guard's face. With Robby's tutelage, Kenny goes after Kyler, who has taunted him, earning his spot at the dojo and impressing Kreese. As a result, he gains more confidence, but like many Cobra Kai students becomes increasingly aggressive. When Anthony steals Kenny’s clothes to embarrass him during gym class at one point, Kenny furiously tells Robby that he’s had enough of the bullying from Anthony and his friends and vows to use his training to get back at them once and for all. Despite the latter's disapproval, Kenny uses his training from Silver to lure Anthony and his friends into a trap at the middle school library to attack them and exposes them for their bullying of him, getting them all suspended from school. Later during the All-Valley tournament, he loses to Robby in the quarter finals. Anthony approaches Kenny in the locker room afterwards and attempts to apologize for tormenting him only for a vengeful Kenny, furious with Anthony's past actions against him and losing the quarter finals match to Robby with a broken nose, to viciously attack him in retaliation for his past actions against him before Robby intervenes and breaks off the fight. Kenny vows revenge against Anthony when they begin high school the next year. Horrified by Kenny’s actions against Anthony, Robby lectures Kenny for going against how he trained him to fight, but Kenny, having been corrupted by Cobra Kai, asserts "no mercy" before leaving. Robby later tearfully reconciles with his estranged father Johnny after he is horrified by Kenny's vengeful actions against Daniel's son Anthony.

In Season 5, Kenny becomes one of the top students behind Tory in Silver's Cobra Kai and torments Anthony with the help of his Cobra Kai gang in retaliation for his past actions against him by kicking him into a pool and even going so far as to give Anthony a swirly at one point. During the Sekai Taikai tryouts, Kenny is pitted against Hawk. Using the "silver bullet" technique he learned from Silver (who had paid off the referee), Kenny defeats Hawk by cutting off his airway, forcing him to forfeit. When the Miyagi-Fang students attempt to expose Silver's cheating at the All-Valley Tournament, Kenny leads the Cobra Kai students in attacking them, who knew about the raid thanks to Mitch tipping them off. During the fight, he singles out Robby for leaving him to rejoin Miyagi-Do and Eagle Fang, taking advantage of his compassion and defeats him with the silver bullet, until Miguel comes to Robby's defense and easily defeats Kenny. After Silver's actions are exposed and Silver's ultimate defeat by Daniel LaRusso, Kenny, feeling betrayed and devastated, abandons Cobra Kai. In the aftermath, Robby attempts to speak with a depressed Kenny, but Kenny sadly asks to be left alone before leaving in shame while Tory reassures Robby that Kenny will talk to him again after recovering from the aftermath.

 Devon Lee 
Devon Lee (Oona O'Brien) is a student and member of the debate team alongside Bert at West Valley High School. Needing a female student for the All-Valley Tournament after losing potential recruit Piper to Cobra Kai, Johnny sees her aggressiveness while debating and recruits her to Eagle Fang. Devon further impresses Johnny with her knowledge of martial arts films and her quick learning. At the tournament, she is defeated in the quarterfinals by Tory but is unfazed by her loss, stating that she only has been training for 6 weeks.

In Season 5, Devon initially remains in Eagle Fang but leaves to join Topanga Karate, which is later taken over by Cobra Kai. She becomes close friends with Tory after they connect over their shared pasts during a training session. During the Sekai Taikai tryouts, after Tory bails out of her match, Devon fights Sam but ultimately loses despite the referee having been bribed by Silver in Cobra Kai's favor. When Tory changes sides, Devon is initially hurt, but she comes to Tory's defense when she falls into trouble during the dojo brawl. After Silver's defeat, she abandons Cobra Kai.

Kandace
Kandace (Rebecca Lines) is Tory's sleazy maternal aunt. She confronts Tory outside the Cobra Kai Dojo, hoping to attain her mother's disability checks. Tory refuses, knowing she will use it for her own benefit at the expense of her family. As Tory and Kandace are in a custody battle over her younger brother, Kandace taunts Tory over her dropout and being a criminal despite sharing a similar record herself. Before leaving, she points out she knows how to manipulate the court in her favor, causing Tory to seek help from Amanda.

Lia Cabrera
Lia Cabrera (Milena Rivero) is a student at West Valley Middle School and a childhood friend and crush of Anthony LaRusso. During the first day of school, she befriends a newcomer named Kenny Payne after she diffuses a fight between him and Anthony's friends. This connection leads Anthony and his friends to catfish and bully Kenny. After Kenny is humiliated, she continues to remain friends with him, but remains unaware of the rivalry between Anthony and Kenny. It is also implied that she might have a crush on Kenny, who shares similar feelings.

Charlotte
Charlotte (Phoebe French) is one of Terry Silver's newly recruited female students who join Cobra Kai along with Piper. She is mostly a background character, shown either witnessing Cobra Kai students train for the tournament or training alongside them. She also attends the Junior Prom as well. She is also seen spectating matches in the All Valley Karate Tournament, though she never makes it to final rounds which could be implied that she had either been defeated by Miyagi Do, Eagle Fang, or a different dojo offscreen.

Lindsey
Lindsey (Gianna Graziano) is another female student recruited by Terry Silver alongside Charlotte and Piper Elswith.

Cheyenne Hamidi
Cheyenne Hamidi (Salome Azizi) is Terry Silver's girlfriend at the beginning of Season 4. She is a vegan, is in the process of launching her new Mindfulness App, and refers to him as "Terrance". She is unaware of Silver's past in Vietnam or with Cobra Kai. Silver abandons Cheyenne and their circle of friends once he decides to return to Cobra Kai with Kreese.

 Vanessa LaRusso 
Vanessa LaRusso (Julia Macchio) is Louie LaRusso's sister, Daniel's cousin, and a second year graduate student in Child Psychology. When Daniel and Amanda are searching for help on how to deal with Anthony, Louie convinces them to consult her. Vanessa analyzes the underlying motivations behind Anthony's behavior at school and later evaluates Daniel and Amanda and calls them out about how their behavior is contributing to it, deducing that their lack of attention and discipline towards him through his childhood as the cause of Anthony acting out. 

In Season 5, she is secretly dating Anoush, which infuriates her brother Louie when he finds out.

Zack Thompson
Zack Thompson (Brock Duncan) is a student at West Valley Middle School and one of Anthony's friends. He is shown to be cruel to Kenny and to a certain extent Anthony, as seen when he peer pressures him into catfishing Kenny, gives him the nickname "LaPusso", and belittles him during a basketball game. He is later suspended from school along with Anthony and his friends for their bullying after Kenny lures them into a trap.

Greg Hughes
Greg Hughes (P.J. Byrne) is Stingray's next door neighbor when he is living at his sister's house. He is annoyed with Stingray's childish behavior and his fanaticism of Cobra Kai, leading to him nicknaming him "Stink-Ray". He later calls him out for his behavior during the prom after-party in front of the partygoers, pointing out Stingray has no friends his age and threatens to arrest the partygoers for underage drinking. Stingray later beats him up as the crowd watches.

Slade Wang
Slade Wang (Alex Boyer) is a student at West Valley Middle School and a member of Anthony's gang who helps Anthony catfish Kenny online and later beat him up at a park while cosplaying. He, along with Anthony and his friends get suspended from school for their bullying of Kenny after he gets lured into a trap.

Marcus
Marcus (Jaden Labady) is a member of Anthony's gang who helps him bully Kenny at school. Marcus is eventually suspended for his bullying after being lured into a trap in the school's library.

Carrie Underwood
Carrie Underwood (herself) is a multi-Grammy Award-winning country pop singer who is invited by Ron to the 51st All-Valley Tournament to perform her rendition of Survivor's "The Moment of Truth" prior to the male and female qualifying rounds. Ron reveals to the other board members that her husband is a client at his dental office.

Cobra Kai: Season 5 (2022) introductions
Sean Kanan reprises his role as Mike Barnes, and Robyn Lively reprises her role as Jessica Andrews from The Karate Kid Part III. In addition, Yuji Okumoto (Chozen Toguchi) has a recurring role throughout Season 5.

 Kim Da-eun 
Kim Da-eun (Alicia Hannah-Kim) is a cruel and harsh sensei from South Korea and the granddaughter of Kim Sun-yung, a ruthless martial arts master who taught Korean War soldiers Tang Soo Do and the teachings of Cobra Kai. She and her senseis are recruited by Terry Silver to help him develop Cobra Kai, with the promise of helping her to bring back her grandfather's forgotten legacy. During her trainings, she torments Tory and the other students through physical and emotional means. After she witnessed Silver's defeat by Daniel LaRusso, it is implied Da-eun cuts her ties from Silver, but her allegiances currently remain ambiguous.

 Hector Salazar 
Hector Salazar (Luis Roberto Guzmán) is the owner of an underground cage fighting ring in Ceuta, Mexico and Miguel's biological father. According to Carmen Diaz, he was said to have been involved in illegal activities. Miguel first encounters Hector after rescuing his young stepson from a speedy car. As a gesture of gratitude, he invites Miguel to his house. Hector brings Miguel in for a visit to his business. After Johnny and Robby show up unannounced in FBI shirts, Hector runs off into an abandoned subway, dragging Miguel with him. In a drunken statement, he reveals that he was originally a wealthy man from Ecuador that had profited from his illegal ventures until he was arranged to marry Carmen. He admits he has no regret for his past deeds, which led to him being exiled. Upon learning of this, Miguel regretfully leaves Mexico with Johnny, but does not tell Hector that he is his son.

 Joanne 
Joanne (Rachelle Carson-Begley) is Amanda's mother who lives alone in Ohio. When Amanda was in high school, her father (whom she didn't get along with) had an affair with her math tutor. In a fit of rage, Amanda beat up her math tutor's car with a baseball bat (while her tutor was still in the car), leading to Amanda's arrest and Joanne's inevitable divorce from her husband. Her niece Jessica Andrews gave her the mac n' cheese that Jessica made for Daniel, after she discovers that he did not come to Ohio with Amanda and the kids (Episode 5).

 Lizzie-Anne 
Elizabeth Anne Rooney  (Sunny Mabrey), nicknamed Lizzie-Anne, is a high school acquaintance of Jessica Andrews and her cousin Amanda Steiner. In 1985 (The Karate Kid Part III), Daniel meets Jessica, whom he learns split from her boyfriend, because he started dating Lizzie-Anne. However, Jessica and her boyfriend make up and get back together. 

Over thirty years later (Cobra Kai, Season 5), Lizzie-Anne bullies Jessica, who is having a drink with her cousin Amanda (Steiner) LaRusso at a local Columbus restaurant. Lizzie-Anne begins to harass Amanda, reminding her about the high school baseball bat incident, but finally leaves. When she remembers Amanda's high school nick-name, she again taunts the duo, which leads to a bar fight that Sam ultimately breaks up by kicking Lizzie-Anne in the ribs.

 Kim Sun-yung 
Kim Sun-yung (Don L. Lee; flashback) was a ruthless South Korean sensei who was a master of Tang Soo Do karate during the Korean War. He is on the same fighting level as Mr. Miyagi. According to Chozen, his style used deception and was known for being quite lethal, being able to counter direct attacks and throw opponents off guard. Because of this, it was considered "controversial" by other martial arts masters including Sato Toguchi since it was based on the tenets of "no honor, no mercy". Kim intended to spread these teachings, known as "The Way of the Fist" across the world, something that his granddaughter, Kim Da-eun later sought to do as part of his legacy. These teachings would later be passed down to American soldiers, like Captain George Turner, who in turn passed this philosophy down to John Kreese and Terry Silver during the Vietnam War, starting the chain of events that would lead to the opening of the Cobra Kai dojo and the spread of its philosophy of "strike first, strike hard, no mercy".

 Gunther Braun 
Gunther Braun (Carsten Norgaard) is the German representative for the Sekai Taikai karate tournament. He bonds with Johnny over their shared love of Rocky IV.

 Gabriel 
Gabriel (Owen Harn), is a criminal who beats up John Kreese in the prison. Later he is defeated by Kreese and earns his respect, even referring to Kreese as "Sensei". He is later implied to have helped Kreese fake his death and escape prison by stabbing him in the abdomen with red Jell-O as a substitute for blood.

 Sensei Odell 
Sensei Odell (Tyron Woodley) is one of Kim Da-eun's six hired senseis originally from South Korea. During a training session at the Cobra Kai dojo, Kyler and Kenny are forced to work as a team against him, leading to both boys being defeated. However, Kenny later uses Kyler as a distraction to defeat Odell. During the fight at Silver's house, Odell and the other senseis pulverize Johnny for a time until he gains the upper hand. Odell, in the end, is defeated with his left pinky finger sliced off.

 Dr. Folsom 
Dr. Emily Folsom (Tracey Bonner) is the psychiatrist at the prison Kreese is detained in. She tries to help Kreese with his psychological issues but ultimately to no avail when Kreese used her kindness in order to swipe her keycard and escape prison.

Additional adaptations
The Karate Kid (1989 animated series)

 Daniel LaRusso 
Daniel LaRusso (Joey Dedio)

 Mr. Miyagi 
Mr. Miyagi (Robert Ito)

 Taki Tamurai 
Taki Tamurai  (Janice Kawaye)

The Karate Kid (2010)

 Dre Parker 
Dre Parker (德瑞帕克 Déruì Pàkè, Jaden Smith), like Daniel LaRusso and Julie Pierce, goes into training for self-defense after being bullied. Dre was originally from Detroit, Michigan, but Dre and his mother move to Beijing, China, to start a new life after his mom gets a job transfer. Dre's mother was thrilled about Beijing, although Dre wasn't particularly thrilled about the move. Shortly after moving to Beijing, Dre immediately fell in love with a pretty young violinist named Mei Ying. Soon after he kissed her as well. It was obvious that she had mutual feelings for Dre, but a local bully and kung fu prodigy named Cheng attempted to keep them apart. Afterward, Cheng continually tormented Dre until he was stopped by Mr. Han. After Mr. Han's interference, Dre began to learn kung fu from Han when Cheng's Shifu, Master Li, challenged them to a fight, which forced Dre to compete in the upcoming 'Open Kung Fu Tournament'. At the tournament, Dre managed to defeat Master Li's students and ultimately Cheng himself. After his victory, Dre had earned the respect of Cheng and his friends. Like Johnny in the original movie, Cheng personally presented the trophy to Dre.

 Mr. Han 
Mr. Han (Jackie Chan) is a Chinese maintenance man who becomes Dre's Shifu. He is based on Mr. Miyagi from the original films. The film follows the same storyline as the original, and several lines and actions are repeated from the original. Unlike Miyagi, he lacks his sense of humor and lightheartedness and appears more conflicted and depressed. He is also shown to have a car in his living room and is fixing it. However, Han is a practitioner of kung fu, and elements of his backstory differ from Miyagi's, such as the circumstances surrounding his wife's and son's death. In this version, Han tells Dre that while they were driving in his car, he was distracted by an argument with his wife and they crashed, killing them, and he's guilt-ridden over it. Every year, he smashes the car after fixing it on the date of their deaths and fixes it again after that to repeat the cycle, hoping to relieve his guilt somehow. He continues to train Dre for the Kung Fu tournament.

 Sherry Parker 
Sherry Parker (雪莉∙帕克; Xuělì Pàkè, Taraji P. Henson) is the mother of Dre Parker and much like Lucille LaRusso in the original film. She is played by Taraji P. Henson.

 Cheng 
Cheng (陆伟程 Lù Wěichéng, Zhenwei Wang) is the main villain in The Karate Kid (2010) who is Dre's arch rival. He is a bigger student attending the same school as Dre and continually harasses him throughout the film for Dre's interactions with his possible love interest, Mei Ying. He is the top student at the Fighting Dragon studio run by Master Li, who teaches his students to treat their enemies and opponents without mercy. He also goes as far as drastically beating him in the secluded back entrance of Dre's apartment before being stopped and defeated by Mr. Han. Cheng is much like Johnny Lawrence: the bully of the school, rich, well-known, the leader of his own gang of friends (though Cheng's gang numbers 6 including himself, contrary to Johnny's gang of 5 including himself), and distressing and thrashing the protagonist. Similarly, as in the first The Karate Kid film, Dre earns Cheng's respect when he beats him at the finals of the 'Open Kung Fu Tournament' and Cheng personally awards Dre the trophy and he and his friends showed Mr. Han respect. In the alternative ending, Cheng is about to get slapped by Master Li for failing to win the tournament and showing respect towards Dre and Mr. Han, but luckily, Han comes to the rescue by defeating Master Li in a match. This parallels the opening scene from Karate Kid, Part II.

 Meiying 
Meiying (Wenwen Han) is Dre's love interest. She plays the violin, and gains admittance into the Beijing Academy of Music. They become close while attending a local festival. Like Ali Mills in the original film, she and Dre first meet after Dre and his mother move into their apartment in China. One day at school, Dre encourages her to skip both school and violin practice for a day of fun. However, they later learn that her performance was rescheduled to later that very day, nearly causing her to be late. Although she makes the appointment, her parents deem Dre to be a bad influence and instruct them to remain apart. Dre rehearses a written apology to Meiying's father, which Mr. Han had translated for him, in which he asks for forgiveness. Meiying's father accepts and promises him that Meiying will be at his tournament. At the end of the film, she is seen cheering loudly, keeping her 'pinky promise' to Dre, which was for her to be the loudest fan to cheer for him when he would win the Kung Fu tournament.

 Liang 
Liang (梁子浩 Liáng Zǐhào, played by Shijia Lü 吕世佳 Lǚ Shìjiā) one of Cheng's friends and the second-best student at the Fighting Dragons studio who antagonizes Dre. Like Bobby Brown in the original film, he is more civil than the rest of Cheng's gang and the least vicious of Dre's tormenters. Later, he injures Dre's leg during the semi-finals of the tournament on Master Li's orders and deeply regrets his actions afterward. As a result of severely injuring Dre's leg, Liang gets disqualified. In the end, Liang, along with Cheng and their friends, develops a newfound respect for Dre and Mr. Han after Dre fairly defeats Cheng in the tournament. Sometimes, he also has pity for Dre and shows mercy.

 Master Li 
Master Li (Yu Rongguang) is Cheng's Kung Fu instructor. Like John Kreese, Master Li teaches his students to be ruthless and merciless towards their enemies, which includes using unsportsmanlike or illegal moves. Han tells Dre that Master Li does not teach his students real kung fu, but is a "bad man teaching them very bad things". When Dre and Han arrive at the Fighting Dragon studio to make peace, the bruised Cheng tells him that Han was the one who "attacked" him. Li attempts to coerce a fight from either Han or Dre, but Han instead arranges for Dre to fight at an upcoming Kung Fu tournament. During the tournament, Li instructs Liang, one of his best students, to deliver an illegal strike to Dre's leg, preventing him from continuing the tournament and allowing Cheng to win the tournament by default. Ultimately, Dre returns to the ring and ultimately defeats Cheng, much to Li's anger. Also, Master Li lost all his students to Han after losing to him in a fight. It is currently unknown what happened to him afterwards, though it is quite possible that the police eventually arrested him for his bad influencing on his students.

In the alternate ending, Master Li seeks to slap Cheng for failing to win the tournament and showing his newfound respect for Dre and Mr. Han. However, he is prevented from doing so by Han, who beats him in a fight, paralleling the beginning of The Karate Kid, Part II. Dre's mother then punches Li in the jaw as a punishment for ordering his students to attack her son.

 Broadway 
In January 2020, a Broadway musical adaptation of The Karate Kid'' was revealed to be in development. Amon Miyamoto will serve as director, with an accompanying novel being written by the original film's screenwriter Robert Mark Kamen. Drew Gasparini will serve as the lyricist and composer of the score, while Keone & Mari Madrid will choreograph the play. Kumiko Yoshii, Michael Wolk will serve as producers, with The Kinoshita Group. The cast will include Jovanni Sy as Mr. Miyagi, John Cardoza as Daniel LaRusso, Kate Baldwin as Lucille LaRusso, Alan H. Green as John Kreese, Jake Bentley Young as Johnny Lawrence, Jetta Juriansz as Ali Mills and Luis-Pablo Garcia as Freddie Fernandez. The opening date has yet to be announced.

References

External links
 
 
 
 
 
 
 
The Karate Kid and Cobra Kai – Reunited Apart, December 21, 2020

Karate Kid

Karate Kid

fr:Karaté Kid (série de films)#Personnages